= Textual variants in the New Testament =

Differences in New Testament manuscripts

Textual variants in the New Testament manuscripts arise when a copyist makes deliberate or inadvertent alterations to the text that is being reproduced. Textual criticism of the New Testament has included study of its textual variants.

Some common alterations include the deletion, rearrangement, repetition, or replacement of one or more words when the copyist's eye returns to a similar word in the wrong location of the original text. If their eye skips to an earlier word, they may create a repetition (error of dittography). If their eye skips to a later word, they may create an omission. They may resort to performing a rearranging of words to retain the overall meaning without compromising the context. In other instances, the copyist may add text from memory from a similar or parallel text in another location. Otherwise, they may also replace some text of the original with an alternative reading. Spellings occasionally change. Synonyms may be substituted. A pronoun may be changed into a proper noun (such as "he said" becoming "Jesus said").

Origen, writing in the 3rd century, was one of the first who made remarks about differences between manuscripts of texts that were eventually collected as the New Testament. He declared his preferences among variant readings. For example, in Matthew 27:16–17, he favored "Barabbas" against "Jesus Barabbas" In John 1:28, he preferred "Bethabara" over "Bethany" as the location where John was baptizing. "Gergeza" was preferred over "Geraza" or "Gadara". At Hebrews 2:9, Origen noticed two different readings: "apart from God" and "by the grace of God".

John Mill's 1707 Greek New Testament was estimated to contain some 30,000 variants in its accompanying textual apparatus, which was based on "nearly 100 [Greek] manuscripts." Eberhard Nestle estimated this number in 1897 as 150,000–200,000 variants. In 2005, Bart D. Ehrman reported estimates from 200,000 to 400,000 variants based on 5,700 Greek and 10,000 Latin manuscripts, various other ancient translations, and quotations by the Church Fathers. In 2014 Eldon J. Epp raised the estimate as high as 750,000. Peter J. Gurry puts the number of non-spelling variants among New Testament manuscripts around 500,000, though he acknowledges his estimate is higher than all previous ones.

Since 1981, in a system developed and introduced by Kurt and Barbara Aland in their textbook The Text of the New Testament, Greek New Testament manuscripts have commonly been categorized into five groups.

Below is an abbreviated list of textual variants in the New Testament.

== Legend ==
A guide to the sigla (symbols and abbreviations) most frequently used in the body of this article.

General sigla
# beginning with 0: uncial
# not beginning with 0: minuscule
^{*} superscript: original reading
^{c} superscript: scribal correction
^{ms} superscript: individual manuscript
^{mss} superscript: multiple manuscripts
^{pt} superscript: partial attestation
^{vid} superscript: uncertain reading
arab: Arabic versions
arm: Armenian versions
𝔐 or Byz: Byzantine text-type
cop: Coptic versions

sa: Sahidic version
bo: Boharic version

eth: Ethiopic versions
ƒ: Greek manuscripts family
geo: Georgian versions
goth: Gothic versions
it: Italic/Vetus Latina
lat: most Italic and Vulgate
latt: all Italic and Vulgate
𝔓: papyrus
𝑙: individually numbered lectionary
Lect: most or all numbered lectionaries
parenthesized (): approximate reading
rell: all other extant manuscripts
slav: Slavic versions
syr: Syriac versions
vg: Latin Vulgate
ς: Textus Receptus

Uncial sigla
א: Codex Sinaiticus (01)
A: Codex Alexandrinus (02)
B: Codex Vaticanus (03)
C: Codex Ephraemi Rescriptus (04)
D^{ea}: Codex Bezae (05)
D^{p}: Codex Claromontanus (06)
K^{e}: Codex Cyprius (017)
K^{ap}: Codex Mosquensis I (018)
L^{e}: Codex Regius (New Testament) (019)
L^{ap}: Codex Angelicus (020)
P^{apr}: Codex Porphyrianus (025)
S: Codex Vaticanus 354 (028)
V: Codex Mosquensis II (031)
W: Codex Washingtonianus (032)
Z: Codex Dublinensis (035)
Γ: Codex Tischendorfianus IV (036)
Δ: Codex Sangallensis 48 (037)
Θ: Codex Koridethi (038)
Ξ: Codex Zacynthius (040)
Π: Codex Petropolitanus (New Testament) (041)
Φ: Codex Beratinus (043)
Ψ: Codex Athous Lavrensis (044)
Ω: Codex Athous Dionysiou (045)
ff^{1}: Codex Corbeiensis I
ff^{2}: Codex Corbeiensis II
g^{1}: Codex Sangermanensis I
k: Codex Bobiensis

Critical editions
T8th: Tischendorf's 8th Edition of Editio Octava Critica Maior
WH: Westcott and Hort (1881)
NA: Novum Testamentum Graece (Nestle–Aland)
UBS: United Bible Societies
ECM: Editio Critica Maior

== Variants ==
This running list of textual variants is nonexhaustive, and is continually being updated in accordance with the modern critical publications of the Greek New Testament — United Bible Societies' Fifth Revised Edition (UBS5) published in 2014, Novum Testamentum Graece: Nestle-Aland 28th Revised Edition of the Greek New Testament (NA28) published in 2012, and Novum Testamentum Graecum: Editio Critica Maior (ECM) last published in 2017 — and supplemented by nonmodern publications wherever applicable, including those of Hodges & Farstad, Greeven, Lachmann, Legg, Merk, Nestle-Aland editions 25–27, Aland's Synopsis Quattuor Evangeliorum (SQE), Souter, Swanson, Tischendorf, Tregelles, von Soden, and Westcott & Hort.

== Gospel of Matthew ==
15 Textual variants in Matthew 1

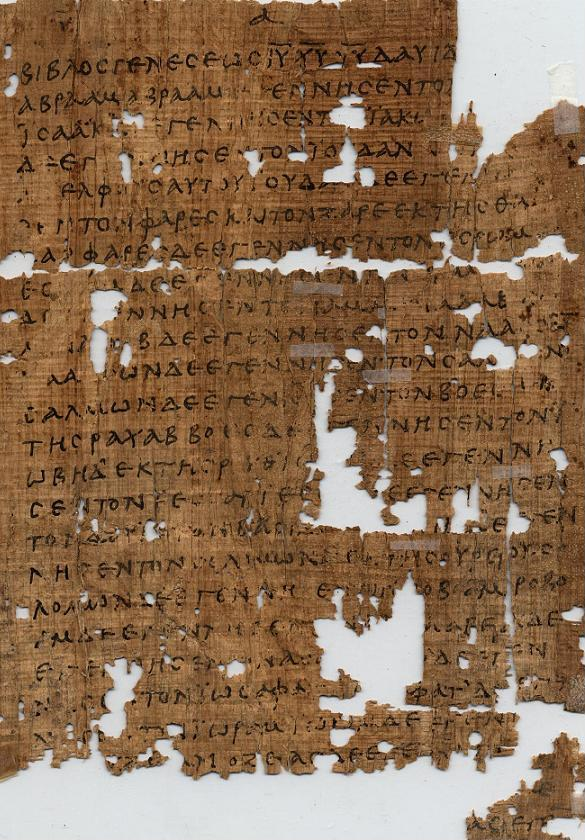
Papyrus 1 with text Matthew 1:1-9; in 1,3 it has a variant Ζαρε against Ζαρα

Matthew 1:3

Ζαρε — 𝔓^{1} B mae-1
Ζαρα — rell (i.e., all other extant manuscripts)

Matthew 1:6

Δαυιδ δε ο βασιλευς (Also David the king) — C K L W Δ Π 33 157 892 1071 𝔐/Byz it^{mss} vg syr^{h} geo
Δαυιδ δε (Also David) — 𝔓^{1} א B Γ ƒ^{1} ƒ^{13} 579 700 it^{g^{1},k} vg^{mss} syr^{s, c, p} cop arm Didymus

Matthew 1:9

Αχαζ — B L W Θ ƒ^{1} ƒ^{13} Byz
Αχας — א C g^{1}

Matthew 1:11

τον Ιωακιμ, Ιωακιμ δε εγεννησεν — M U Θ Σ ƒ^{1} 33 258 478 661 954 1216 1230 1354 1604 Lectionary 54 syr^{h} geo
omitted by majority

Matthew 1:12-13

γεννα – Β
εγεννησεν (begot) – א

Matthew 1:16

τον ανδρα Μαριας, εξ ης εγεννηθη Ιησους ο λεγομενος Χριστος – 𝔓^{1} א Β C K L P W (Δ omit τον) Π (ƒ^{1} omit Ιησους) 28 33 565 700 892 1009 1010 1071 1079 1195 1216 1230 1241 1242 1365 1546 1646 2148 2174, Byz, Lect, ℓ 76, ℓ 211, vg
ω μνηστευθεισα παρθενος Μαριαμ εγεννησεν Ιησουν τον λεγομενον Χριστον – Θ ƒ^{13}

Matthew 1:16

Ιησους (Jesus) – omitted by ƒ^{1}

Matthew 1:18

Ιησου (Jesus) — W
Χριστου (Christ) – 71 Latt syr^{s,c} Diatessaron^{syr} Theophilus Irenaeus^{lat} Chromatius Jerome^{pt} Augustine
Χριστου Ιησου (Christ Jesus) – B Origen^{pt} Jerome^{pt}
Ιησου Χριστου (Jesus Christ) — rell (𝔓^{1} א C E K L P Z Δ Θ Π Σ ƒ^{1} ƒ^{13}, most minuscules, Byz, Lect, syr^{p,h,pal} cop arm (eth) geo slav Diatessaron^{arm} Irenaeus^{gr} Origen^{pt} Eusebius Epiphanius Chrysostom)

Matthew 1:21

τεξεται δε σοι υιον (Then she will bring forth to you a son) – syr^{s,c}
τεξεται δε υιον (Then she will bring forth a son) – rell

Matthew 1:21

αυτος γαρ σωσει τον κοσμον (for he will save the world) — syr^{c}
αυτος γαρ σωσει τον λαον αυτου (for he will save his people) — rell

Matthew 1:22

δια Ησαιου του προφητου (through Isaiah the prophet) – D 269 954 it^{a,b,c,d} vg^{mss} syr^{s,h,pal} cop^{sa^{ms}} arm Diatessaron^{syr} Irenaeus^{lat}
δια στοματος Ησαιου του προφητου (through the mouth of Isaiah the prophet) – syr^{c}
δια του προφητου (through the prophet) – rell

Matthew 1:23

καλεσεις το ονομα (you^{sg} will call his name) – D^{*,2} it^{d^{(c)},ff^{1}} cop^{bo^{mss}} Origen Eusebius
καλεσει το ονομα (he will call his name) – it^{d*}
καλεσουσιν το ονομα (they will call his name) – rell

Matthew 1:24

ἐγερθεὶς (woke) – א B C* Z 071 ƒ^{1}
διεγερθεὶς (was awakened) – C^{3} D L W 087 ƒ^{13} 33 𝔐/Byz

Matthew 1:25

ουκ εγινωσκεν αυτην εως ου (was not knowing her until which [time]) – omitted by it^{k} syr^{s}

Matthew 1:25

υιον (a son) – א B Z^{vid} 071^{vid} ƒ^{1} ƒ^{13^{pt}} 33 1192 it^{b,c,g^{1},k} syr^{c,pal^{mss}} mae-1 geo Ambrose Chromatius
αυτω υιον (to him a son) – syr^{s}
τον υιον (the son) – cop^{bo}
υιον αυτης (her son) – 1182 cop^{sa}
τον υιον τον πρωτοτοκον (the firstborn son) — D* L it^{d,q}
τον υιον αυτης τον πρωτοτοκον (her firstborn son) — rell

14 Textual variants in Matthew 2

Matthew 2:3

πασα (everyone) — omitted by D

Matthew 2:4

παρ' αυτων (close to them) — omitted by D Γ

Matthew 2:5

per Esiam prophetam dicentum (through Isaiah the prophet who related) — it^{a}
δια του προφητου Μιχαιου (through the prophet Micah) — 4 cop^{bo^{ms}}
δια του προφητου (through the prophet) – rell

Matthew 2:9

επανω (over) — omitted by syr^{s} Origen

Matthew 2:9

του παιδιου (of the child) — D it
ου ην το παιδιον (where the child was) — rell

Matthew 2:11

ευρον (they found) — 2^{c}, 474, it^{aur,b,c,ff^{1},g^{1}} vg
ειδον (they saw) — rell

Matthew 2:11

τας πηρας (their bag) — Epiphanius
τους θησαυρους (their treasures) — rell

Matthew 2:12

εις την χωραν αυτων (into their country) – Β
εις την εαυτων χωραν (into their own country) – א f^{1} 157 a b g^{1} vg cop

Matthew 2:13

κατ οναρ εφανη – Β 372 cop^{sa}
φαινεται κατ οναρ (appeared in a dream) – א

Matthew 2:15

του στοματος Ησαιου του προφητου (the mouth of Isaiah the prophet) — syr^{s}
του προφητου (the prophet) — rell

Matthew 2:17

ρηθεν υπο Κυριου δια Ιερεμιου (spoken by the LORD through Jeremiah) — D it^{aur}

Matthew 2:18

κλαυθμὸς (weeping) — א, B, Z, Z, 0250, ƒ^{1}, 22 279 372 1491 ℓ^{2211} lat syr^{p,pal} cop^{sa,mae} eth Justin Hilary Jerome Augustine Hesychius
θρηνος (lamentation) — cop^{bo}
θρῆνος καὶ κλαυθμός (lamentation and weeping) — C D E K L W Δ Π Σ 0233 ƒ^{13}, most minuscules 𝔐/Byz, ℓ 70, ℓ 150, ℓ 185, ℓ 1761, it^{(d)} syr^{s,c,h} arm eth geo slav Origen Proclus

Matthew 2:18

βρυγμος (gnashing) — Z
οδυρμος (wailing) — rell

Matthew 2:21

ηλθεν (came) – D L W 0233 0250 ƒ^{1} ƒ^{13} 33 cop^{pt} 𝔐
εισηλθεν (entered) – א B C cop^{pt}
επανηλθεν (was returning) – cop^{pt} Eusebius

11 Textual variants in Matthew 3

Matthew 3:3

φωνη βοωντος εν τη ερημω (A voice shouting in the wild) – omitted by syr^{s}

Matthew 3:3

ευθειας ποιειτε τας τριβους αυτου (Make his paths straight) – omitted by it^{k} syr^{s}

Matthew 3:3 (see Isaiah 40:3)

του Θεου ημων (of our God) – it^{b} syr^{c} Irenaeus
omitted (see previous variant) – it^{k} syr^{s}
αυτου – rell

Matthew 3:5

παιδια Ιεροσολυμα (the children of Jerusalem) – syr^{s,c}
τα Ιεροσολυμα (the Jerusalemites) – 157 1071^{c}
πασα Ιεροσολυμα (all Jerusalem) – 517 892 1424
πασα η Ιεροσολυμα (all of Jerusalem) – ƒ^{1} 22 1365 it^{a,k,l} vg^{ms} arm Origen
Ιεροσολυμα (Jerusalem) – rell

Matthew 3:6

εις τον Ιορδανην (into the Jordan) – 983 1689
εν τω Ιορδανη (in the Jordan) – C^{3} D K L Π ƒ^{13} 28 700 892 𝔐 lat mae-1
εν τω Ιορδανη ποταμω (in the Jordan River) – א B C* M S W Δ 0233 ƒ^{1} 22 33 157 346 579 1424 it^{q} syr cop arm Origen

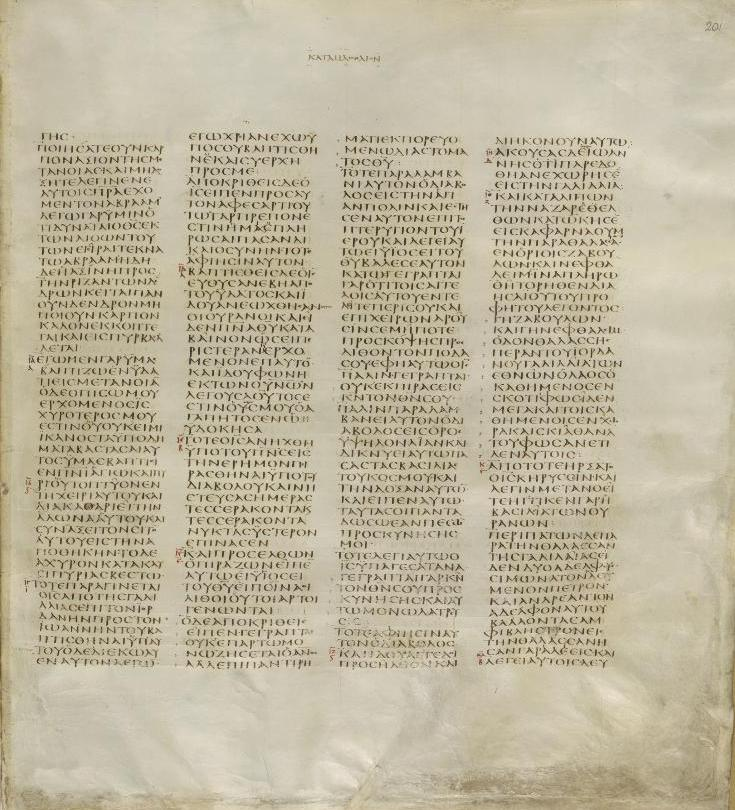
Sinaiticus, Matthew 3:7-4:19

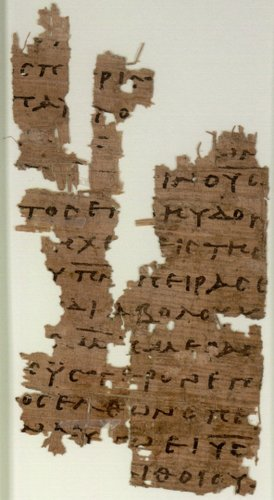
Matt 3:10-12 from Papyrus 101

Matthew 3:9

εν εαυτοις (in yourselves) – omitted by it^{mss} syr^{s} Chrysostom

Matthew 3:11

οπισω μου (behind me) – omitted by 𝔓^{101} it^{a,d} cop^{sa^{mss}} Cyprian

Matthew 3:11

και πυρι (and fire) – omitted by E S V Ω 2 28 517 579 1424 𝔐 syr^{pal}

Matthew 3:14

Ιωαννης (John) – omitted by א* B 𝑙^{1043} cop^{sa} Eusebius

Matthew 3:15

τοτε αφιησιν αυτον βαπτισθηναι (Then he permitted him to be baptized.) — syr^{s,c}
[τοτε αφιησιν αυτον] et cum baptizaretur lumen ingens circum fulsit de aqua, ita ut timerent omnes qui advenerant (Then he permitted him. And when he should be baptized, a prodigious light shone about from (down upon?) the water, so that all they who had come would fear.) — it^{a}
[τοτε αφιησιν αυτον] et cum baptizaretur Iesus lumen magnum fulgebat de aqua, ita ut timerant omnes qui congregati erant (Then he permitted him. And when Jesus should be baptized, a great light was shining from (down upon?) the water, so that all they who were gathered together would fear.) — it^{g^{1}}
και πυρ ανηφθη εν τω Ιορδανη (And fire was kindled in the Jordan.) — Justin Martyr
...the light that appeared on the water [of the Jordan]... — Diatessaron^{Tatian} (per Ephrem)
και ευθυς περιελαμψε τον τοπον φως μεγα (And immediately a great light illuminated that place) — Gospel^{Heb} (per Epiphanius)
τοτε αφιησιν αυτον (Then he permitted him.) — rell

Matthew 3:17

λεγουσα προς αυτον Συ ει ο υιος μου (saying to him, "You are my son") – D it^{a,d} syr^{s,c,pal} Irenaeus
λεγουσα Ουτος εστιν ο υιος μου (saying, "This is my son") – rell

18 Textual variants in Matthew 4

Matthew 4:2

και νυκτας τεσσερακοντα (and forty nights) – omitted by ƒ^{1} syr^{c} Irenaeus

Matthew 4:4

εκπορευομενω δια στοματος (going out through the mouth) – omitted by D it^{a,b,d,g^{1}} Clement Tertullian Augustine

Matthew 4:6

βαλε σεαυτον εντευθεν κατω (Throw yourself down from here) – C* Θ syr^{s} cop^{bo}
βαλε σεαυτον κατω (Throw yourself down) – rell

Matthew 4:8

δικνυει (showed) – א
δεικνυσιν (showed) – Β
εδειξεν (showed) – D 372

Matthew 4:10

υπαγε (Go away!) – א B C*^{vid} K P S V W Δ Σ 0233 ƒ^{1} ƒ^{13} 22 372 565 579* 700 892* 1079 1546 2680 2737 𝑙^{253} it^{f,k,l^{(c)}} vg^{mss} syr^{p,h,pal} cop^{mss} geo^{mss} slav^{mss} Diatessaron^{arm} Ignatius Irenaeus^{pt} Tertullian Origen Hilary Chromatius Basil Jerome
vade retro (Go behind!) – it^{a, aur, c, ff^{1}, g^{1}} vg^{mss} Irenaeus^{arm}
υπαγε οπισω μου (Get behind me!) – C^{2} D E L Z 28 33 118^{supp} 157 180 205 209 597^{c} 892^{c} 1006 1009 1010 1071 1195 1216 1230 1241 1242 1243 1253 1292 1365 1424 1505 1582^{c} 1646 2148 2174 𝔐 𝑙^{76} it^{b,d,h,l*} vg^{ms} syr^{c} cop^{mss} arm eth geo^{mss} slav^{mss} Diatessaron^{syr} Justin Liber Graduum Athanasius Asterius Ephraem (Ambrose) Chrysostom (Augustine) Nestorius^{mss}
υπαγε οπισω σου (Get behind you or Get you behind) – syr^{s}

Matthew 4:12

ο Ιησους (Jesus) – omitted by א B C*^{vid} D Z 33 700 1010 1241 it^{ff^{1},k} syr^{s} cop Origen

Matthew 4:13

παραθαλασσαν (by the sea) – א W
παραθαλασσιαν (by the sea) – B
παραθαλασσιον (by the sea) – D 372

Matthew 4:17

μετανοειτε (Repent!) – omitted by it^{k} syr^{s,c} (Justin) Clement Origen^{mss} (Eusebius)

Matthew 4:18

Παραγων (while passing) – D it syr^{s} Eusebius
Περιπατων (while walking) – rell

Matthew 4:18

τον λεγομενον Πετρον (who is called Peter) – omitted by syr^{s}

Matthew 4:21-22

Both verses omitted – W 33

Matthew 4:23

ο Ιησους (Jesus) – omitted by B 𝑙^{20} 𝑙^{1043} it^{(k)} syr^{c} cop^{sa,mae-1}

Matthew 4:23

εν τη Γαλιλαια (in Galilee) – א
εν ολη τη Γαλιλαια (in all Galilee) – B C 157 cop syr eth
ολην την γαλιλαιαν (all Galilee) – D

4:23b

διδασκων αυτοις – א
διδασκων – Β

Matthew 4:24

πασαν την Συριαν (whole of Syria) – א 157
ολην την Συριαν (all Syria) – Β

Matthew 4:24

Και απηλθεν η ακοη αυτου εις ολην την Συριαν (And the report of him went forth into all of Syria) – omitted by syr^{s}

Matthew 4:24

δαιμονιζομενους και σεληνιαζομενους και παραλυτικους (those being possessed by demons, and those being moonstruck, and the paralytics) – omitted by syr^{s}

Matthew 4:24

και παντας εθεραπευσεν (and he tended to all) – D it syr^{s,c}
text omitted – it^{(k)}
και εθεραπευσεν αυτους (and he tended to them) – rell

36 Textual variants in Matthew 5

Matthew 5:4-5

Verses appear in reverse order (5-4) – D 17 33 130 it^{a,aur,c,d,ff^{1},g^{1},h,k,l} vg syr^{c} cop^{bo^{ms}} Diatessaron Clement Origen Eusebius Apostolic Canons Aphraates Hilary Ephraem Basil Gregory Ambrose Chrysostom^{pt} Jerome Augustine Theodoret^{pt}

Matthew 5:9

οτι υιοι – א C D 13-124-556
οτι αυτοι υιοι – B

Matthew 5:10

ενεκα – B
ενεκεν –א

Matthew 5:11

οταν οι ανθρωποι (whenever other men) – 0133 it^{aur*,(g^{1}),(q)} syr^{s,c}
οταν (whenever) – rell

Matthew 5:11

ρημα (statement) – omitted by א B D 𝑙^{1043} lat syr^{(s),c} cop Tertullian

Matthew 5:11

ψευδομενοι (while lying i.e. falsely) – omitted by D it^{b,c,d,g^{1},h,k} syr^{s} Tertullian Origen^{pt} Eusebius Hilary Lucifer Ambrose Chromatius^{pt} Augustine^{pt} Speculum

Matthew 5:11

ενεκεν του ονοματος μου (for the sake of my name) – syr^{s,c}
ενεκεν δικαιοσυνης (for the sake of righteousness) – D it^{mss}
ενεκεν εμου (for my sake) – rell

Matthew 5:12

τους προ υμων (who were before you) – omitted by syr^{s}

Matthew 5:18

παρελθη απο του νομου και των προφητων (pass away from the Law and the Prophets) – Θ Σ ƒ^{13} 565 1071 syr^{pal^{mss}} arm Irenaeus^{lat}
παρελθη απο του νομου (pass away from the Law) – rell

Matthew 5:18

εως παντα – B 106
εως αν παντα –א

Matthew 5:19

ος δ’ αν ποιηση και διδαξη ουτος μεγας κληθησεται εν τη βασιλεια των ουρανων (but whoever should do them and should teach them, the same will be called great in the kingdom of the heavens) – omitted by א* D W it^{d} cop^{bo^{ms}}

Matthew 5:20

Verse omitted – D it^{d} vg^{ms}

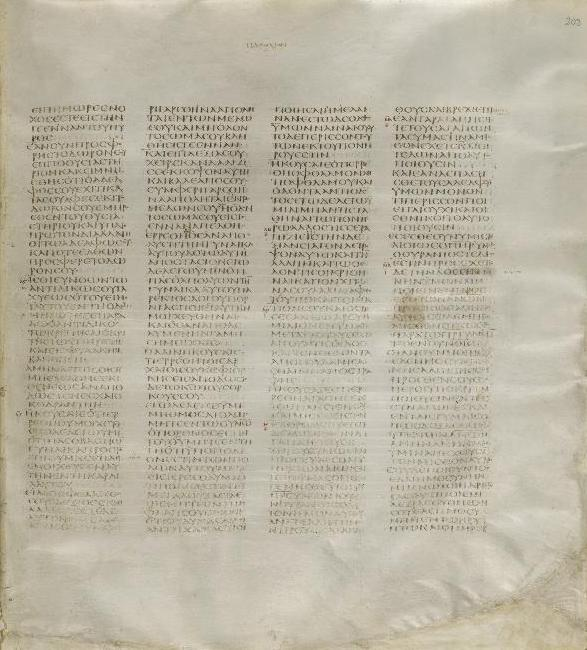
Sinaiticus, Matthew 5:22-6:4

Matthew 5:22

ραχα – א* D W
ρακα – Β

Matthew 5:22

οργιζομενος τω αδελφω αυτου (angry at his brother) – 𝔓^{64} א* B Ω 372 1292 1424^{mg} 2174^{vid} 2737 it^{aur} vg^{mss} eth^{mss} Gospel^{Naz} Ptolemy Justin Clement Tertullian^{vid} Origen Theodore Basil Chromatius Jerome Augustine^{pt} Cassian
οργιζομενος τω αδελφω αυτου εικη (angry at his brother without cause) – א^{2} D E K L W Δ Θ Π Σ 0233 0287 ƒ^{1} ƒ^{13}, most minuscules, 𝔐 Lect it vg^{mss} syr cop goth arm eth^{mss} geo slav Diatessaron Irenaeus Origen^{mss} Cyprian Eusebius Hilary Lucifer Basil Apostolic Constitutions Chrysostom Augustine^{pt} Cyril Jerome^{mss} Speculum Theodoret Theodore of Mopsuestia

Matthew 5:25

ο κριτης (the judge) – 𝔓^{64}^{(vid)} א B 0275 ƒ^{1} ƒ^{13} 372 892 1216 1230 it^{k} syr^{pal} arm eth geo^{mss} Carpocrates Irenaeus^{lat} Clement Hilary Chrysostom Augustine
ο κριτης σε παραδωσει (the judge will hand you over) – D
ο κριτης σε παραδω (the judge should hand you over) – K L W Δ Θ Π 0233 22 28 33 565 (700) 1009 1010 1071 1079 1195 1241 1242 1365 1546 1646 2148 2174 𝔐 Lect lat syr^{c,p,h} cop goth geo^{mss} Jerome
text omitted – syr^{s}

Matthew 5:27

ερρεθη τοις αρχαιοις (it was told to the ancients) – L Δ Θ 0233 ƒ^{13} 33 579 892 1010 𝔐^{mss} vg^{mss} syr^{c} Irenaeus^{lat} Origen^{lat} Eusebius^{pt} Cyril
ερρεθη (it was told) – rell

Matthew 5:28

επιθυημσαι – א 236
επιθυμησαι αυτην – Β W
επιθυμησαι αυτης – א M Σ

Matthew 5:28

εαυτου – Β
αυτου – א

Matthew 5:29

απελθη εις γεενναν (should depart into Gehenna) – D 700^{mg} it^{mss} syr^{s,c} cop^{bo,(mae)}
βληθη εις γεενναν (should be cast into Gehenna) – rell

Matthew 5:30

Verse omitted – D it^{d} vg^{ms} syr^{s} cop^{bo^{ms}}

Matthew 5:30

εις γεενναν απελθη (into Gehenna he should depart) – א B ƒ^{1} 22 33 157 517^{supp} 892 lat syr^{c} cop^{bo,(mae)}
βληθησει εις την γεενναν (will be cast into the Gehenna) – L
βληθη εις γεενναν (should be cast into Gehenna) – W Δ Θ 0233 ƒ^{13} 𝔐 it^{f} vg^{ms} syr^{p,h} cop^{sa} goth Basil

Matthew 5:31

ερρεθη – א* Κ Π syr cop^{bo}
ερρεθη δε – B

Matthew 5:32

και ος εαν απολελυμενην γαμηση μοιχαται (and whoever should marry her who has been divorced, they commit adultery) – א^{(*),c} E K (L) W Δ (Θ) Π Σ 0250 ƒ^{1} ƒ^{13} 22 28 33 157 180 205 565 (579) 597 700 892 1006 1009 1010 1071 1079 1195 (1216) 1230 (1241) 1242 1243 1292 1342 1365 1424 1505 1646 (2148) 2174 𝔐 Lect it^{h} syr^{h} cop^{bo,mae} goth arm eth^{mss} Basil Chrysostom
και ο απολελυμενην γαμησας μοιχαται (and the one who should marry her who has been divorced, they commit adultery) – B (828) (𝑙^{184}) 𝑙^{185} 𝑙^{1579} lat syr cop^{sa} (geo) slav Origen
και ος απολελυμενην μοιχαται (and he who ... her who has been divorced, they commit adultery) – 1546
text omitted – D 64 it^{a,b,d,k} Origen^{mss} Zeno Chromatius Augustine^{pt} Augustine^{mss} Speculum

Matthew 5:33

τοις αρχαιοις (to the ancients) – omitted by it^{k} syr^{s} Irenaeus^{lat}

< Matthew 5:37

εσται – Β Σ 61 68 245 700
εστω – א

Matthew 5:39

εις την δεξιαν σιαγονα – א W Σ 157 892
σιαγονα σου – B D
σου σιαγονα – E

Matthew 5:39

δεξιαν (right) – omitted by D it^{d,k} syr^{s,c}

Matthew 5:41

αγγαρευει – D
αγγαρευσει – B L M S U Π
αγγαρευση – א E G K V Δ Σ
και ος λεγει σοι – syr^{cur}

Matthew 5:42

αιτουντι σοι – א* y
αιτουντι σε – B

Matthew 5:44

ευλογειτε τους καταρωμενους υμας καλως ποιειτε τοις μισουσιν υμας (bless those who curse you, do good to those who hate you) – D^{(*),c} E K L W Δ Θ Π Σ 047 ƒ^{13} 28 33 118^{supp} 157 180 565 579 597 700 892 1006 1009 1010 1079 1185 1195 1216 1241 1242^{c} 1243 1292 1342 1365 1424 1505 1546 1646 2148 2174 𝔐 Lect^{mss} it^{c,d,f,h} syr^{(p),h,(pal)} mae-1 goth arm^{mss} eth^{mss} geo^{mss} slav Aphraates (Lucifer) Apostolic Constitutions (Chrysostom) (Speculum)
ευλογειτε τους καταρωμενους υμας (bless those who curse you) – 1071 𝑙^{866} 𝑙^{871} 𝑙^{1016} cop^{bo^{mss}} geo^{mss} (Athenagoras) Clement Tertullian Eusebius^{pt} (Theodoret) Cassiodorus
καλως ποιειτε τοις μισουσιν (do good to those hating you) – 1230 1242* lat arm^{mss} Eusebius^{pt} Ambrose Chromatius Jerome Augustine Arsenius
Text omitted – א B ƒ^{1} 22 205 279 660* 1192 2786* it^{k} syr^{s,c} cop^{sa,bo^{mss}} Codex Schøyen Theophilus Irenaeus^{lat} Origen Cyprian Adamantius Faustus

Matthew 5:44

επηρεαζοντων υμας (insultingly mistreat you) – omitted by א B ƒ^{1} 205 it^{k} syr^{s,c} cop^{sa,bo^{mss}} eth^{mss} Athenagoras Theophilus Irenaeus^{lat} Tertullian Origen Cyprian (Adamantius) Faustus Lucifer Jerome^{pt} Augustine (Speculum)

Matthew 5:45

και βρεχει επι δικαιους και αδικους – B
omit – א

Matthew 5:46

ουχι – B
οmit – א* cop^{bo} syr^{cur}

Matthew 5:47

Verse omitted – it^{k} syr^{s}

Matthew 5:47

φιλους (loved ones) – L W Δ Θ 28 33 𝔐 it^{f,h} syr^{h} goth Basil
αδελφους (brethren) – א B D Z ƒ^{1} ƒ^{13} 22 372 472 892 lat syr^{c,p} cop Cyprian
ασπαζομενους υμας (those who greet you) – 1424

Matthew 5:47

εθνικοι (Gentiles) – א B D Z Δ ƒ^{1} 22 33 174 (205) 279 372 892 1071 1216 1230 1241 1365 1424 2680 2786 lat syr^{s,c,h,pal} cop eth geo^{mss} Cyprian (Lucifer) Basil Chromatius Augustine
τελωναι (tax collectors) – E K L W Δ Θ Π Σ ƒ^{13} 28 157 180 565 579 597 700 1006 1009 1010 1079 1195 1242 1243 1292 1342 1505 1546 1646 2148 2174 𝔐 Lect it^{h} syr^{p} goth geo^{mss} slav
τελωναι και οι αμαρτωλοι (tax collectors and the sinful people) – arm

34 Textual variants in Matthew 6

Matthew 6:1

δικαιοσυνην (your righteousness) – א^{*,2} B D 0250 ƒ^{1} 372 892 1424* Lat syr^{s,pal} Origen
δοσιν (your giving) – א^{1} syr^{c} cop^{sa^{mss},bo}
δοσεις (your gifts) – Diatessaron^{syr}
ελεημοσυνην (your alms-giving) – L W Z Δ Θ ƒ^{13} 22 28 33 𝔐 it^{f,k} syr^{p,h} cop^{mae-1} arm goth Clement Origen^{mss} Didymus Basil

Matthew 6:2

αμην αμην (amen, amen) – א 13
αμην (amen) – B

Matthew 6:4

αποδωσει σοι (he will recompense you) – א B D Z ƒ^{1} ƒ^{13^{pt}} 22 33 205 983 1192 1292 1689 2786 it^{aur,d,ff^{1},k} vg syr^{c} cop Diatessaron^{syr} Origen Cyprian Chromatius Jerome Augustine
αποδωσει σοι εν τω φανερω (he will recompense you in the open) – E K L W Δ Θ Π Σ 0250 ƒ^{13^{pt}} 13 28 157 (168) 180 565 579 597 (700) 828 892 1006 1009 1010 1071 1079 1195 1216 1230 1241 1242 1243 1342 1365 1424 1505 1546 1646 2148 2174 𝔐 Lect it^{a,b,c,f,g^{1},h,l,q} syr^{s,p,h,pal} arm goth eth geo slav Diatessaron^{arm} Basil Nilus Chrysostom Speculum

Matthew 6:5

Verse omitted – syr^{s}

Matthew 6:6

προσευξαι τω πατρι σου εν τω κρυπτω (pray to your Father in secret) – D ƒ^{1} ƒ^{13} 700 it^{mss} vg^{mss} syr^{s,c} cop^{bo^{mss}}
προσευξαι τω πατρι σου τω εν τω κρυπτω (pray to your Father who is in secret) – rell

Matthew 6:6

αποδωσει σοι (he will recompense you) – א B D Z ƒ^{1} 22 205 1192 2786* it^{aur,d,ff^{1},k} vg syr^{s,c,pal^{mss}} cop Diatessaron^{syr} Origen Eusebius (Pseudo-Clementine) Hilary Ambrose Chromatius Augustine
αποδωσει σοι εν τω φανερω (he will recompense you in the open) – E G K L W X Δ Θ Π Σ ƒ^{13} 28 33 157 180 565 579 597 700 892 1006 1009 1010 1071 1079 1195 1216 1230 1241 1242 1243 1292 1342 1365 1424 1505 1546 1646 2148 2174 𝔐 Lect it^{a,b,c,f,g^{1},h,l,π,q} syr^{p,h,pal^{mss}} arm goth eth geo slav Diatessaron^{arm} Chrysostom Cyril

Matthew 6:7

υποκριται (hypocrites) – B 1424 syr^{c} cop^{mae}
εθνικοι (Gentiles) – rell

Matthew 6:8

ο πατηρ υμων ο ουρανιος (your heavenly father) – 047 28 892^{mg} 1195 1216 1424 1505 syr^{h} eth geo^{mss} Basil^{pt}
ο θεος ο πατηρ υμων (your God the Father) – א^{1} B cop^{sa,mae-1} Origen^{pt}
ο πατηρ ο ουρανιος (the heavenly father) – Origen^{pt}
ο πατηρ ημων (our father) – ƒ^{1} 205 1253 1546 𝑙^{76} 𝑙^{184} 𝑙^{387} 𝑙^{859} 𝑙^{1074} 𝑙^{1663}
ημων ο εν τοις ουρανιος (our one in the heavenly) – 2148
ο πατηρ υμων (your father) – א* D E G K L W Z Δ Θ Π Σ 0170^{vid} ƒ^{13} 22 33 157 180 565 579 597 700 892* 1006 1009 1010 1071 1079 1230 1241 1242 1243 1292 1342 1365 1646 2174 𝔐 Lect^{mss} latt syr^{s,c,p,pal} cop^{bo,fay} arm goth geo^{mss} slav Diatessaron^{syr} Origen^{pt} Basil^{pt} Ambrose Ambrosiaster Chromatius Jerome Augustine
Text omitted – Codex Schøyen

Matthew 6:8

ανοιξε το στομα (open your mouth) – D it^{h}
αιτησαι αυτον (ask him) – rell

Matthew 6:9

τω ουρανω (the heaven) – cop^{mae} Didache
τοις ουρανοις (the heavens) – rell

Matthew 6:11

ελθειν (to come) – cop^{sa}
τον επαυριον (of tomorrow) – cop^{bo,mae} Gospel^{Heb} (per Jerome)
αναγκαιον (necessary) – syr^{p,h}
διαρκης (lasting or continual) – syr^{c}
supersubstantialem (supersubstantial) – vg
cottidianum (quotidian) – it vg^{mss}
επιουσιον (superessential) – rell

Matthew 6:12

την οφειλην (my obligation) – Didache
τα παραπτωμα (our transgressions) – Origen
τα οφειληματα (debts) – rell

Matthew 6:13 (see 1 Chronicles 29:11–13)

οτι σου εστιν η βασιλλεια και η δυναμις και η δοξα εις τους αιωνας. αμην (Because yours is the kingdom and the power and the glory into the ages. Amen.) – E G K L W Δ Θ Π Σ 0233 ƒ^{13} 22 28 33 180 565 579 597 700 892 1006 1009 1010 1071 1079 1195 1216 1230 1241 1242 1243 1292 1365 1424 1505 1546 1646 (2148) 2174 𝔐 Lect it^{f,(g^{1}),(q)} syr^{(p),h,pal} cop^{bo^{mss}} arm goth eth geo slav Diatessaron^{arm} Apostolic Constitutions Chrysostom
οτι σου εστιν η βασιλλεια και η δυναμις και η δοξα του πατρος και του υιου και του αγιου πνευματος εις τους αιωνας. αμην (Because yours is the kingdom and the power and the glory of the Father and of the Son and of the Holy Spirit into the ages. Amen.) – 157 225 418
οτι σου εστιν η βασιλλεια του πατρος και του υιου και του αγιου πνευματος εις τους αιωνας. αμην (Because yours is the kingdom of the Father and of the Son and of the Holy Spirit into the ages. Amen.) – 1253
quoniam est tibi virtus in saecula saeculorum (Since to you is the power in the ages of ages) – it^{k}
οτι σου εστιν η δυναμις και η δοξα εις τους αιωνας. αμην (Because yours is the power and the glory into the ages. Amen.) – cop^{sa,fay} (Didache)
οτι σου εστιν η βασιλλεια και η δοξα εις τους αιωνας. αμην (Because yours is the kingdom and the glory into the ages. Amen.) – 1342 syr^{c}
οτι σου εστιν η βασιλλεια και η δυναμις εις τους αιωνας. αμην (Because yours is the kingdom and the power into the ages. Amen.) – 𝑙^{1016}
Text omitted – א B D Z 0170 ƒ^{1} (17) 130 205 372 890 1090^{c} 2701^{supp} 2737 2780* 2786 𝑙^{547} lat cop^{bo^{mss},mae} Diatessaron^{syr} Acta Thomae Tertullian Origen Cyprian Hilary (Cyril) Caesarius Gregory Ambrose Ambrosiaster Chromatius Jerome Augustine Cyril Maximus

Matthew 6:14

ο ουρανοις τα παραπτωματα υμων (the heavens your transgressions) – L ƒ^{13} 𝑙^{844} lat cop Didymus
ο εν τοις ουρανοις (who is in the heavens) – Θ 700 it
ο ουρανιος (the heavenly) – rell

Matthew 6:15

τα παραπτωματα αυτων (their transgressions) – omitted by א D ƒ^{1} 1 22 118 130 205 209 279 372 892* 1357* 1582* 2701^{supp} 2737 2786 lat syr^{p} cop^{bo^{mss},fay,mae-1} Diatessaron Eusebius Augustine

Matthew 6:16

και οταν δε – א syr^{cur} eth
οταν δε – Β

Matthew 6:16

υποκριται – א
οι υποκριται – Β

το προσωπον – 244 א g^{1} k syr^{p}
τα προσωπα – B

αμην γαρ – א, cop^{bo}
αμην – Β

Matthew 6:18a

νηστευων τοις ανθροποις – Β
τοις ανθρωποις νηστευων –א

6:18b

σου – א Δ syr^{cur}
omit – Β

Matthew 6:18

αποδωσει σοι (he will recompense you) – א B D G K L W Θ Π Σ 0250 ƒ^{1} ƒ^{13} 28 33 180 565 597 700 892 1006 1010 1079 1242 1292 1365 1424 1646 𝔐^{pt} Lect^{pt} it^{aur,f,ff^{1},l,q} vg syr cop goth arm^{mss} Theophilus Euthalius Petrus
αποδωσει υμιν (he will recompense you all) – Ambrose Chromatius Augustine Speculum
αποδωσει υμιν εν τω φανερω (he will recompense you all in the open) – it^{a,b,c,g^{1},h,k} eth^{ms}
αποδωσει σοι εν τω φανερω (he will recompense you in the open) – E Δ 0233 157 205 209 579 1009 1071 1195 1216 1230 1241 1243 1253 1342 1505 1546 2174 𝔐^{pt} Lect^{pt} arm^{mss} eth^{mss} geo slav Diatessaron^{arm} Ephraem

Matthew 6:20

και κλεπτουσιν (and steal) – א ƒ^{1} 𝑙^{844} it^{mss} syr^{c}
Text omitted – W it^{k}
ουδε κλεπτουσιν (nor steal) – rell

Matthew 6:21

εκει εσται η καρδια – B cop^{bo}
ουδε κλεπτουσιν – Β syr^{p}

Matthew 6:22

ο οφθαλμος σου – Β
ο οφθαλμος –א

6:22b

εαν ουν – B
εαν –א

Matthew 6:23

εαν δε ο οφθαλμος σου πονηρος – א W 33
εαν δε ο οφθαλμος σου πονηρος η – B cop it
εαν δε ο οφθαλμος σου η πονηρος – syr

Matthew 6:24

Ουδεις οικετης δυναται (Not one servant is able) — L Δ 1241
Ουδεις δυναται (No one is able) — rell

Matthew 6:25

η τι πιητε (or what you^{pl} should drink) – B W Φ ƒ^{13} 22^{mg} 33 157 205 1230 1342 𝑙^{547} it^{aur,c,f,g^{1},h,m,q} cop^{sa^{mss},bo,mae-1} arm^{mss} geo^{mss} slav Origen (Eusebius) Athanasius Basil^{pt} Evagrius Jerome^{mss} Nilus Marcus Speculum Maximus
και τι πιητε (and what you^{pl} should drink) – E G K (L) N Δ Θ Π Σ 0233 (28) 180 565 579 597 700 1006 1009 1010 (1071) 1079 1195 1216 1241 1242 1243 1253 1292 1365 1424 1505 1546 1646 (2148) 2174 𝔐 Lect syr^{p,h} goth geo^{mss} Basil^{pt} Augustine^{pt}
Text omitted – א ƒ^{1} 22* 372 892 1592 it^{a,b,ff^{1},k,l} vg syr^{c,pal} cop^{sa^{mss},mae-2} arm^{mss} eth^{mss} Diatessaron^{syr} Justin Clement Methodius Origen Adamantius Hilary Athanasius Epiphanius Chrysostom Jerome Augustine^{pt} Cyril

6:25b

υμων – B
omit – א b

Matthew 6:27

μεριμνων (worrying) — omitted by 1293 it^{mss} syr^{c}

Matthew 6:28

αυξανουσιν ου κοπιωσιν ουδε νηθουσιν (they are growing; they are not laboring, nor are they spinning) — א^{c} (B) ƒ^{1} (33) 205 (1071) latt syr^{p,h,pal} cop eth geo slav Hilary Athanasius Chrysostom^{pt} Augustine Speculum
αυξανουσιν ου νιθουσιν ουδε κοπιωσιν (they are growing; they are not spinning, nor are they laboring) — Θ syr^{c}
αυξανει ου κοπια ουδε νηθει (it is growing; it is not laboring, nor is it spinning) — E G K L N W Δ Π Σ 0233 0281 ƒ^{13} 28 157 180 565 579 597 700 892 1006 1010 1079 1195 1216 1230 1241 1242 1243 1253 1292 1342 1365 1424 1505 1546 2148 2174 𝔐 Lect goth (arm) Basil Chrysostom^{pt} Nilus
ου ξενουσιν ουδε νηθουσιν ουδε κοπιωσιν (they do not card, nor do they spin, nor do they labor) — א*
ου ξαινει ουδε νηθει (it is not carding, nor is it spinning) — P.Oxy.655
αυξανει και ουδε νηθει (it is growing, but it is neither spinning) — 1646
αυξανεν (it is growing) — 1009

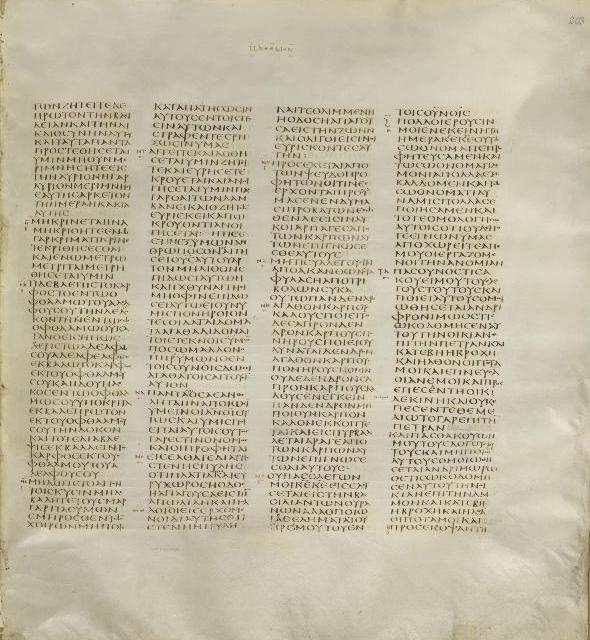
Sinaiticus, Matthew 6:32-7:27

Matthew 6:32

ταυτα γαρ παντα – א N Δ Σ f^{13} 157 892
παντα γαρ ταυτα – B
παντα – a b k

6:32b

ο θεος ο πατηρ υμων – א
ο πατηρ υμων – א^{2} 28 237
ο πατηρ υμων ο ουρανιος – B 050

6:32c

χρητε – B
χρηζετε –א

Matthew 6:33

την βασιλειαν (the kingdom) — א B 57 345 440 817 995 1646 it^{(k),l} vg^{mss} cop eth^{mss} Tertullian Cyprian (Eusebius) Aphraates (Gregory) Didymus^{pt} Macarius Augustine^{pt} Speculum
την βασιλειαν των ουρανων (the kingdom of the heavens) — 301* 366 373 726 1272* 1590* 𝑙^{858} Justin Clement^{pt} Ephraem^{pt} Chrysostom^{pt}
την βασιλειαν του θεου (the kingdom of God) — E G K L N W Δ Θ Π Σ Φ 0233 ƒ^{1} ƒ^{13} 22 28 33 119 157 180 205 245 482 565 579 597 700 892 1006 1009 1010 1071 1079 1195 1216 1230 1241 1242 1243 1253 1292 1342 1365 1392 1424 1505 1546 2148 2174 𝔐 Lect lat syr cop^{mae-1} arm eth^{mss} geo slav Diatessaron^{syr} Clement^{pt} Serapion (Hilary) Basil Didymus^{pt} Evagrius Chrysostom^{pt} Chromatius Jerome Marcus Eremita Augustine^{pt} Cyril Theodoret John

23 Textual variants in Matthew 7

Matthew 7:3

την δε δοκον την εν τω οφθαλμω – א N Σ 235
την δε εν τω σω οφθαλμω δοκον – Β 050

Matthew 7:4a

λεγεις – א 700 0233
ερεις – Β

7:4b

τω αδελφω σου αδελφε – א
τω αδελφω σου – Β

Matthew 7:8

ανοιγεται – Β
ανοιγησεται –א

Matthew 7:9

η τις – Β Ζ
η τις εστιν –א

Matthew 7:12

παντα οσα – א
παντα ουν – B
παντα δε – cop^{bo}

Matthew 7:13

η πυλη (the gate) — omitted by א* 1646 ℓ^{211} it^{a,b,c,h,k} vg^{mss} Clement Hippolytus Origen^{pt} Cyprian Eusebius Didymus^{pt} Augustine^{pt} Speculum

Matthew 7:14

η πυλη (the gate) — omitted by 113 182* 482 544 it^{a,(h),k} Diatessaron Clement Tertullian Origen^{pt} Cyprian Eusebius Aphraates Gregory Gregory Jerome Nilus Augustine Hesychius Speculum

Matthew 7:17

καρπους ποιει καλους – Β cop
καλους ποιει καρπους – Δ δ
καρπους καλους ποιει –א

Matthew 7:18

ποιειν – א
ενεγκειν – B

Matthew 7:21

ουρανοις αυτος εισελευσεται εις την βασιλειαν των ουρανων (in the heavens, he will enter into the kingdom of the heavens) – C^{(2)} W Θ Φ (33) 713 1071 1241 vg syr^{c} Cyprian Theodoret
ουρανοις (in the heavens) – rell

Matthew 7:22

δαιμονια πολλα – א
δαιμονια – B

Matthew 7:22

κυριε κυριε ου τω ονοματι σου εφαγομεν και επιομεν και ου τω σω ονοματι επροφητευσαμεν (Lord, lord, did we not eat and drink in your name? And did we not prophesy in your name?) – syr^{c} Justin (Origen)
κυριε κυριε ου τω σω ονοματι επροφητευσαμεν (Lord, lord, did we not prophesy in your name?) – rell

Matthew 7:23

απ’ εμου παντες (away from me, all of you) – L Θ ƒ^{13} 1424 it^{b} vg^{mss}
απ’ εμου (away from me) – rell

Matthew 7:24

ομοιωθησεται (he will be likened) – א B Z Θ 0281 ƒ^{(1)} ƒ^{13} 33 205 700 892 1071 1241 1365 𝑙^{844} 𝑙^{866} it^{a,aur,b,c,ff^{1},g^{1},l} vg syr^{p,h^{mg},pal^{mss}} cop^{sa,mae} arm eth geo Diatessaron Origen Basil Ambrose Didymus Chrysostom Jerome Augustine^{pt} Cyril
ομοιωσω αυτον (I will liken him) – C E G K L W X Δ Π Σ 157 180 565 579 597 1006 1009 1010 1079 1195 1216 1230 1242 1243 1253 1292 1342 1424 1505 1546 1646 2148 2174 𝔐 Lect it^{f,h,k,q} syr^{c,h,pal^{ms}} cop^{bo} goth slav Cyprian Hilary Lucifer Augustine^{pt} Speculum

Matthew 7:25

ελθαν – B
ελθον –א

Matthew 7:27

ελθαν – B
ελθον –א

7:27b

και επνευσαν οι ανεμοι – Β
omit –א

Matthew 7:27

επνευσαν οι ανεμοι και (the winds blew and) – omitted by א*

Matthew 7:27

μεγαλη σφοδρα (exceedingly great) – Θ Σ ƒ^{13} 33 713 1241^{c} cop^{mae-1} syr^{pal^{mss}} Basil
μεγαλη (great) – rell

Matthew 7:28

παντες (everyone) – 998 Eusebius
παντες οι οχλοι (all of the multitudes or everyone who had crowded around) – Δ Θ ƒ^{1} 22 vg^{ms} syr^{pal^{mss}} Origen
οι οχλοι (the multitudes) – rell

Matthew 7:28

επι τη διδαχη αυτου οι οχλοι – א
οι οχλοι επι τη διδαχη αυτου – Β

Matthew 7:29

και ουχ ως οι γραμματεις (and not as the scribes) — C* L M X 565 700 1424 𝔐 it^{f} syr^{c} goth
και ουχ ως οι γραμματεις αυτων (and not as their scribes) – א B K Π Δ Θ ƒ^{1} ƒ^{13} 22 372 579 892 1365 vg^{mss} cop
και ουχ ως οι γραμματεις αυτων και οι Φαρισαιοι (and not as their scribes and the Pharisees) – C^{2} W 33 1241 lat syr geo^{mss} Eusebius^{pt}

40 Textual variants in Matthew 8

Matthew 8:1

καταβαντος δε αυτου – B C W א^{b}
και καταβαντος αυτου – Z
καταβαντι δε αυτω –א*

Matthew 8:3

ο Ιησους (Jesus) – omitted by א B C* ƒ^{1} ƒ^{13} 33 892 it^{k} cop^{sa^{mss},bo} Cyprian

8:3a

την χειρα αυτου – א 124
την χειρα – B

8:3b

ευθεως – B
omit – א

8:4a

ειπεν – א k cop
λεγει – Β

8:4b

προσενεγκον – B C
προσενεγκε –א

Matthew 8:5

εισελθοντος δε αυτου εις Καφαρναουμ (But he was entering into Capernaum) – א B C* Z ƒ^{1} ƒ^{13} 33 700 1241 it^{aur,ff^{1},l} vg cop^{pt} Origen
εισελθοντι δε αυτω εις Καφαρναουμ (But when he was entering into Capernaum) – L W Θ 0233 𝔐 cop^{pt}
εισελθοντι τω Ιησου εις Καφαρναουμ (When Jesus was entering into Capernaum) – C^{3}
μετα δε ταυτα (But after these things) – it^{k} syr^{(s)}
μετα δε ταυτα εισελθοντος δε αυτου εις Καφαρναουμ (But after these things, then he [went] into Capernaum) – it^{a,b,c,f,g^{1},h,q} syr^{(c)}

Matthew 8:5

χιλιαρχος (chiliarch) – syr^{s,h^{mg}} Clement Eusebius^{pt}
εκατονταρχος (centurion) – rell

Matthew 8:6

κυριε (Lord) – omitted by א* it^{k} syr^{s,c} Origen Hilary

Matthew 8:7

ο Ιησους (Jesus) – omitted by א B 892 it^{k} syr^{s} cop^{bo^{mss}}

Matthew 8:7a

λεγει – Β 700
και λεγει –א

Matthew 8:7b

ακολουθει μοι εγω ελθων – א
εγω ελθων – Β

Matthew 8:8

χιλιαρχος (chiliarch) – syr^{s,h^{mg}} Clement Eusebius^{pt}
εκατονταρχος (centurion) – rell

Matthew 8:8

ο παις μου (my servant) – omitted by ƒ^{1} it^{k} cop^{sa,bo^{mss},mae-1} Origen

Matthew 8:9

υπο εξουσιαν τασσομενος (placed under authority) – א B 4 273 372 792 899* 995 1403 2236 2703 2737 𝑙^{211*} it^{a,aur,b,c,g^{1},h,k,q} vg^{mss} syr^{pal} cop^{pt} Diatessaron Hilary Chrysostom Augustine
υπο εξουσιαν (under authority) – C K L W X Δ Θ Π ƒ^{1} ƒ^{13} 33 565 700 892 1009 1010 1071 1079 1195 1216 1230 1242 1253 1365 1546 1646 2148 2174 𝔐 Lect it^{ff^{1},l} vg^{mss} syr^{(s),c,p,h} cop^{pt} arm (eth) geo Chrysostom
Text omitted – 1241

Matthew 8:10

παρ’ ουδενι τοσαυτην πιστιν εν τω Ισραηλ ευρον (I have otherwise found no one in Israel with so much faith) – B W (0281) 0287 4 (22) 273 335 697 (892) 1005 2586 2701^{supp} 2786 it^{a,(g^{1}),k,q} syr^{c,h^{mg},pal} cop^{sa,bo} eth^{ms} Diatessaron^{arm}
παρ’ ουδενι τοσαυτην πιστιν ευρον (I have otherwise found no one with so much faith) – ƒ^{1} 205
ουδε εν τω Ισραηλ τοσαυτην πιστιν ευρον (Not even in Israel have I found so much faith) – א C E G K L N X Δ Θ Π Σ Φ 0233 0250 ƒ^{13} 33 157 180 565 579 597 700 1006 1009 1010 1071 1079 1195 1216 1230 (1241) (1242) 1243 1253 1292 1342 (1365) 1424 1505 1546 1646 2148 2174 𝔐 Lect it^{aur,b,c,f,ff^{1},h,l} vg syr^{(s),p,h} cop^{mae} arm goth eth^{mss} geo slav Diatessaron^{syr} Origen^{lat} Hilary Chrysostom (Chromatius) Jerome Augustine

Matthew 8:11

εν τοις κολποις Αβρααμ και Ισαακ και Ιακωβ (in the bosoms of Abraham and Isaac and Jacob) – Clement Epiphanius
μετα Αβρααμ και Ισαακ και Ιακωβ (with Abraham and Isaac and Jacob) – rell

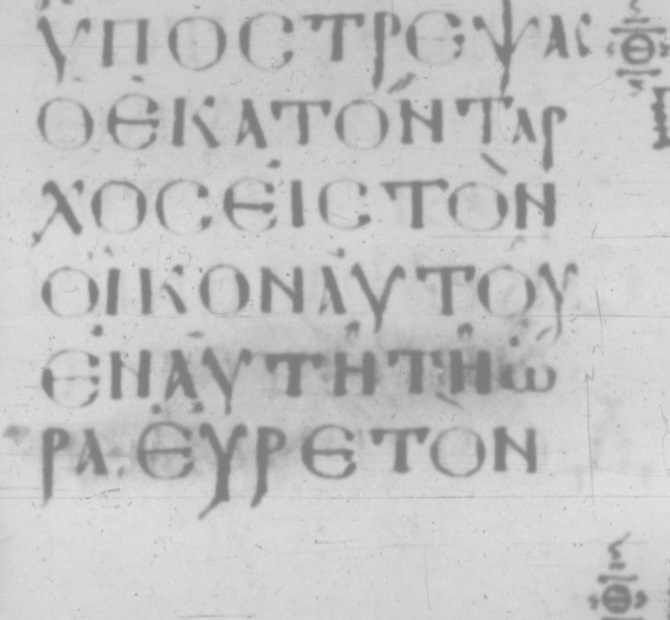
Matt 8:13 in Codex Nanianus

Matthew 8:12

εκβληθησονται (they will be cast out) – א^{1} B C K L W X Δ Θ Π ƒ^{1} ƒ^{13} 33 565 700 892 1009 1010 1071 1079 1195 1216 1230 1242 1253 1365 1546 1646 2174 𝔐 Lect it^{aur,f,ff^{1},l} vg syr^{h} cop goth eth geo^{mss} Cyprian^{pt} Didymus^{pt} Chrysostom
εμβληθησονται (they will be cast into) – 1241 2148
εξελευσονται (they will go forth) – א* 0250 it^{a,b,c,g^{1},h,(k),q} syr^{s,c,p,pal} arm Diatessaron Heracleon Irenaeus Origen Cyprian^{pt} Eusebius Didymus^{pt} Augustine
Text omitted – geo^{mss}

Matthew 8:13

χιλιαρχω (chiliarch) – syr^{s} Clement Eusebius^{pt}
εκατονταρχη (centurion) – rell

Matthew 8:13

εν τη ωρα εκεινη (in that hour) – א B K L X Π ƒ^{1} ƒ^{13} 565 (892) 1009 1071 1079 1195 1216 1230 1241 1242 1253 1365 1546 1646 2148 2174 𝔐 Lect it^{aur,f,ff^{1},k,l} vg^{mss} syr^{s,c,p,h} cop^{sa^{mss},bo^{mss}} goth eth
απο της ωρας εκεινης (from that hour) – C N Δ Θ 0250 33 1010 𝑙^{950} 𝑙^{1627} it^{a,b,c,g^{1},h,q} vg^{mss} syr^{pal} cop^{sa^{mss},bo^{mss}} Eusebius Basil Chrysostom Augustine
εν τη ημερα εκεινη (in that day) – W 700 1424 arm geo

Matthew 8:13 (see Luke 7:10)

Verse concludes with ωρα εκεινη [ωρας εκεινης: C N Θ 0250 33 it^{g^{1}} syr^{pal}] και υποστρεψας ο εκατονταρχος εις τον οικον αυτου εν αυτη τη ωρα ευρον τον παιδα υγιαινοντα (...that hour. And the centurion, returning into his house in that hour, found his servant healthy) – א^{*,2} C E M (N) U X Θ Σ Φ (0250) ƒ^{1} 22 (33) 713 (1241) it^{g^{1}} syr^{h,pal} eth
Verse concludes with ωρα εκεινη (that hour) or ωρας εκεινης (that hour) or ημερα εκεινη (that day) – rell

Matthew 8:15

διηκονει αυτω (she was serving him) – א* B W Θ 700 𝔐^{pt} Lect it^{k} syr^{h} cop^{sa}
διηκονει αυτοις (she was serving them) – א^{1} L Δ ƒ^{1} ƒ^{13} 33 565 892 1424 𝔐^{pt} 𝑙^{844} 𝑙^{2211} lat syr^{s,c} cop^{bo}

Matthew 8:18

οχλον (the multitude) – B cop^{sa^{mss}}
οχλους (the multitudes) – א* ƒ^{1} 22 (1365) 𝑙^{(184)} cop^{(bo)} (Origen)
τους οχλους ερχομενους (the multitudes coming) – 𝑙^{(68)}
οχλον πολυν or πολυν οχλον (the vast multitude) – W 983 1216 1424 1689 𝑙^{524} 𝑙^{1074} it^{c,g^{1}} syr^{s,c} cop^{sa^{ms},mae-1} arm^{mss} eth^{ms} geo slav^{(mss)} (Speculum)
πολλους (many) – 1071 1546*
οχλους πολλους or πολλους οχλους (the many multitudes) – א^{2} C E G K L N X Δ Θ Π Σ 0233 ƒ^{13} 33 108 157 180 205 565 579 597 700 892 1006 1009 1010 1079 1195 1230 1242 1243 1253 1292 1342 1505 1546^{c} 1646 2148 2174 𝔐 Lect lat syr^{p,h,pal} arm^{mss} goth eth slav^{mss} Diatessaron Hilary Chromatius Chrysostom Augustine

Matthew 8:18

εκελευσεν τους μαθητας αυτου απελθειν (he commanded his disciples to depart) – it^{a,aur,b,c,g^{1},q} vg^{mss} Hilary
εκελευσεν τοις μαθηταις αυτου απελθειν (he gave the command to his disciples to depart) – it^{h,l} syr^{c} (goth)
κελευει δε μονοις τοις μαθηταις απελθειν (but he gave command only to his disciples to depart) – Cyril
εκελευσεν απελθειν (he gave the command to depart) – rell

Matthew 8:21

των μαθητων (of the disciples) – א B 33 2148 𝑙^{1761} it^{a,b,c,h,q} cop^{sa} slav Chromatius
των μαθητων αυτου (of his disciples) – C E G K L N W X Δ Θ Π Σ 0250 ƒ^{1} ƒ^{13} 157 180 205 565 579 597 700 892 1006 1009 1010 1071 1079 1195 1216 1242 1243 1292 1342 1424 1505 1546 1646 2174 𝔐 Lect it^{aur,ff^{1},g^{1},(k),l} vg syr cop^{bo,mae} goth arm eth geo Jerome Speculum
των αυτου (of him) – 1365
Text omitted – 1230 1253 Chrysostom

Matthew 8:22

Ιησους (Jesus) – omitted by א 33 it^{b,c,k,q} syr^{s}

Matthew 8:22

ο δε ιησους λεγει – B syr^{cur}
ο δε λεγει – א 33 b c k q syr^{s}

Matthew 8:25

και προσελθοντες (And coming near) – א B 33^{vid} 591 892 930 1421* it^{a,aur,c,ff^{1},k,l} vg^{mss} syr^{pal^{mss}} cop^{sa,bo} Jerome
και προσελθοντες οι μαθηται (And those disciples came near) – C^{2} E K L Δ Π ƒ^{13} 22 157 180 565 579 597 700 1006 1009 1010 1071 1079 1216 1230 1242 1243 1253 1292 1342 1365 1505 1546 2148 2175 𝔐 Lect^{mss} it^{h} vg^{ms} arm geo^{mss} Eusebius Chromatius
και προσελθοντες οι μαθηται αυτου (And those disciples of his came near) – W X Θ Σ Φ ƒ^{1} 205 1195 1424 1646 𝑙^{127} 𝑙^{184} 𝑙^{253} 𝑙^{384} 𝑙^{770} 𝑙^{773} 𝑙^{1016^{pt}} 𝑙^{1780} it^{b,g^{1},(q)} vg^{mss} syr goth eth geo^{mss} slav Diatessaron
και προσελθοντες αυτω οι μαθηται (And those disciples came to him) – geo^{mss}
και προσελθοντες αυτω οι μαθηται αυτου (And those disciples of his came to him) – C*^{vid} vg^{mss} cop^{mae}

Matthew 8:25

σωσον (help!) – א B C ƒ^{1} ƒ^{13^{mss}} 33 205 892 𝑙^{547} syr^{pal^{mss}} cop^{bo^{mss}} Cyril^{pt}
σωσον ημας (help us!) – E K L W X Δ Θ Π Σ 0242^{vid} ƒ^{13^{mss}} 22 157 180 565 579 597 700 828^{c} 1006 1009 1010 1071 1079 1195 1216 1230 1242 1243 1253 1292 1342 1365 1424 1505 1546 1646 2148 2174 𝔐 Lect Latt syr cop arm goth eth geo slav Diatessaron Origen Eusebius Ambrose Gaudentius Chrysostom Chromatius Jerome Augustine Cyril^{pt} Hesychius

Matthew 8:26

τω ανεμω και τη θαλασση – א f^{1} f^{13} 22
τοις ανεμοις και τη θαλασση – Β

Matthew 8:26

τω ανεμω (the wind) – א* ƒ^{1} ƒ^{13} 22 it^{mss} vg syr^{s,p} cop^{sa^{ms},bo^{mss},mae-1} Eusebius Basil
τοις ανεμοις (the winds) – rell

Matthew 8:28

Γεργεσηνων (Gergesenes) – א^{2} C^{mg} E K L W X Π ƒ^{1} ƒ^{13} 22 157 180 205 565 579 597 700 892* 1006 1009 1071 1079 1195 1216 1230 1242 1243 1253 1292 1342 1365 1424 1505 1546 1646 2148 2174 𝔐 Lect syr^{h^{mg},pal} cop^{bo} arm goth eth geo^{mss} slav Diatessaron^{arm} Origen Eusebius^{vid} Apollinaris Epiphanius^{mss} Hesychius
Γερασηνων (Gerasenes) – 892^{c} Δ^{lat} Latt syr^{h^{mg}} cop^{sa,mae} Origen^{mss} Hilary Ambrose Chromatius
Γαζαρηνων (Gazarenes) – א*
Γαραδηνων (Garadenes) – Δ^{gr}
Γαδαρηνων (Gadarenes) – B C M Θ Σ 174 1010 𝑙^{253} syr^{s,p,h} geo^{mss} Diatessaron^{syr} Origen^{mss} Epiphanius

Matthew 8:29

Ιησου (Jesus) – omitted by א B C* L ƒ^{1} 33 892 it^{ff^{1},k,l} vg^{mss} syr^{s} cop^{bo^{mss},mae}

Matthew 8:29

ημας απολεσαι προ καιρου (destroy us before our time) – א* vg^{mss} cop^{bo^{mss}}
απολεσαι ημας και προ καιρου βασανισαι (destroy us and torment us before our time) – W
προ καιρου βασανισαι ημας (torment us before our time) – rell

Matthew 8:30

non longe (not far) – it^{a,aur,b,c,f,ff^{1},g^{1},h,l} vg sax
μακραν (far) – rell

Matthew 8:30

πολλων (many) – omitted by Θ 565 syr^{(s)}

Matthew 8:31

αποστειλον ημας (send us) – א B Θ 0242^{vid} ƒ^{1} 22 33 372 892* 𝑙^{844} 𝑙^{2211} lat syr^{s} cop Cyril
επιτρεψον ημιν απελθειν (allow us to depart) – C L W X Δ ƒ^{13} 565 700 𝔐 Lect it^{f,h,q} syr^{p,h} goth
επιταξον ημιν και απελευσομεθα (give the command to us, and we will depart) – Codex Schøyen

Matthew 8:32

τους χοιρους (those pigs) – א B C* 0242 ƒ^{1} 22 33 372 892 1010 lat syr^{s,p} cop
την αγελην την χοιρων (that herd of pigs) – C^{3} K L M N W X Δ Θ Π ƒ^{13} 565 579 700 1424 𝔐 Lect it^{f,h} syr^{h,pal} goth
Text omitted – 157

Matthew 8:32

αγελη (herd) – א B C* M N W Δ Θ ƒ^{1} ƒ^{13} 33 157 892 1424 Latt syr cop^{sa}
αγελη των χοιρων (herd of pigs) – C^{3} K L X Π 22 565 579 700 𝔐 Lect cop^{bo,mae} goth

Matthew 8:34

των οριων (the borders) – omitted by syr^{s}

50 Textual variants in Matthew 9

Matthew 9:1

εμβας ο Ιησους (embarking, Jesus) – C^{(3)} F Θ^{c} ƒ^{13} vg^{mss}
εμβας (embarking) – rell

Matthew 9:2

αμαρτιαι (sins) – א B C* D W Δ^{c} 0281 ƒ^{1} 33 892 𝑙^{844} 𝑙^{2211} it^{k} vg^{ms}
αμαρτιαι σου (your sins) – C^{(3)} L Δ Θ 0233^{vid} ƒ^{13} 𝔐 Lect lat syr

Matthew 9:4

ιδων (seeing) – א C D E* F G K L (N) W X Δ Π^{*,(mg)} Σ 0233 0281 ƒ^{13} 22 33 180 240 244 579 892 1006 1009 1010 1071 1216 1230 1242 1243 1253 1292 1342 1365 1505 1646 2148 𝔐 Lect^{mss} latt syr^{s,pal^{mss}} cop^{bo} eth^{mss} slav Chromatius Jerome Augustine Speculum
ειδως (perceiving) – B E^{c} M Π^{c} (Θ) ƒ^{1} 157 205 565 597 700 1079 1195 1424 1546 𝑙^{(76)} 𝑙^{184} 𝑙^{253} 𝑙^{313} 𝑙^{(547)} 𝑙^{672} 𝑙^{673} 𝑙^{813} 𝑙^{844} 𝑙^{1223} 𝑙^{1627} 𝑙^{1761} 𝑙^{2211} syr^{(p),h} cop^{sa,mae} arm goth eth^{mss} geo Chrysostom

Matthew 9:4b

εγειρε περιπατει – א cop^{sa} syr
εγειρε και περιπατει – Β

Matthew 9:6a

εγειρε – Β 372
εγειρε και – D
εγερθεις – א C L W Θ 0233 f^{1} f^{13} Byz q

Matthew 9:6b

πορευου – א, cop^{sa} and cop^{bo} used different terms, but every concerned to πορευου
υπαγε – Β

Matthew 9:8

εφοβηθησαν (they were afraid) – א B D W 0281 ƒ^{1} 22 33 59 143 205 372 496 517 751 892 930 951 1192 1424 1532 1675 1823 2147 2459 2586 2637 2737 lat syr^{s,p,pal} cop Hilary Chromatius Augustine
εθαυμασαν (they were astounded) – C E F G K L N Δ Θ Π Σ Φ 0233 ƒ^{13} 157 180 565 579 597 700 1006 1009 1010 1071 1079 1195 1216 1230 1242 1243 1253 1292 1342 1365 1505 1546 1646 2148 𝔐 Lect syr^{h} arm eth^{mss} geo slav Chrysostom
εφοβηθησαν και εθαυμασαν (they were afraid and they were astounded) – it^{(f)} (goth) eth^{(mss)} Diatessaron
Text omitted – X 213 Irenaeus^{lat}

Matthew 9:9

εκειθεν (from there) – omitted by א* L cop^{bo^{ms}}

Matthew 9:9b

λεγει – א cop^{sa}
και λεγει – Β cop^{bo}

Matthew 9:9c

ηκολουθει – א D f^{1} 21 892
ηκολουθησεν – B

Matthew 9:10a

και ανακειμενου – א
και εγενετο αυτου ανακειμενου – B

Matthew 9:10b

ιδου – א D 892
και ιδου – Β

Matthew 9:10c

ελθοντες – א 243 ℓ 50
omit – B

Matthew 9:11

δια τι μετα των τελωνων και αμαρτωλων εσθιετε και πινει ο διδασκαλος υμων (How come you^{pl} are eating and your teacher is drinking with tax collectors and sinners?) – M 565 cop^{mae}
δια τι μετα των τελωνων και αμαρτωλων εσθιετε και πινετε (Why are you^{pl} eating and drinking with tax collectors and sinners?) – syr^{s}
δια τι μετα των τελωνων και αμαρτωλων εσθιει (Why is he eating with tax collectors and sinners?) – it^{a}
δια τι μετα των τελωνων και αμαρτωλων καθησαι (Why are you seated with tax collectors and sinners?) – it^{k}
δια τι μετα των τελωνων και αμαρτωλων εσθιει ο διδασκαλος υμων (Why is your teacher eating with tax collectors and sinners?) – rell

Matthew 9:12

Ιησους (Jesus) – omitted by א B D 0233* 0281 892 1010 1424 𝑙^{844} it^{a,f,h,q} syr^{s} cop^{sa,mae}

Matthew 9:12

ιατρων – א
ιατρου – Β

Matthew 9:13

αμαρτωλους (sinners) – א B D N W Γ* Δ 0233 ƒ^{1} 22 33 174 372 565 𝑙^{844} 𝑙^{2211} lat syr^{p,h} cop^{bo^{mss},mae-2} goth
αμαρτωλους εις μετανοιαν (sinners into repentance) – C L X Θ 0281 ƒ^{13} 700 𝔐 it^{c,g^{1}} syr^{s,h^{mg},pal} cop^{sa,bo^{mss},mae-1} Basil

Matthew 9:14

νηστευομεν πολλα (much fasting) – א^{2} C D E F G K L N W X Δ Θ Π Σ Φ 0233 ƒ^{1} ƒ^{13} 22 33 157 (180) 205 565 579 597 700 892 1006 1009 1010 1071 1079 1195 1216 1230 1242 1243 1253 1292 1342 1365 1424 1505 1546 1646 2148 2174 𝔐 Lect it^{d,(k)} syr^{p,h,pal} cop^{sa^{(mss)},bo,mae-1} goth eth geo^{mss} Basil Chrysostom
νηστευομεν πυκνα (frequent fasting) – א^{1} lat syr^{(s)} arm Hilary Chromatius Jerome Augustine
νηστευομεν (fasting) – א* B 0281 10 27* 71 86 179 569 692 895 947 982 1091* 1170 1194 1386 1413 1517* 2487* 2581 2676 cop^{sa^{ms},mae-2} geo^{mss} Cyril

Matthew 9:15

οι υιοι του νυμφιου (the children of the bridegroom) – D lat
οι υιοι του νυμφωνος (the children of the bridal chamber) – rell

Matthew 9:15

νηστευειν (fast) – D W 1424 it syr^{(s),p,h^{mg}} cop^{sa,bo^{mss},mae}
πενθειν (grieve) – rell

Matthew 9:15

αρθη (taken up) – D ƒ^{1}
αφερθη (taken away) – W
απαρθη (taken away) – rell

Matthew 9:15

και τοτε νηστευσουσιν εν εκειναις ταις ημεραις (and then they will fast in those days) – D it syr^{h^{mg}}
και τοτε νηστευσουσιν (and then they will fast) – rell

Matthew 9:15

ελευσονται – א*
omit – B

Matthew 9:16

το πληρομα αυτου – Β
το πληρομα –א

Matthew 9:17

ει δει μη – Β 301 cop^{sa}
ει δε μηγε – א

Matthew 9:18

ιδου αρχων προσελθων – א 13 157
ιδου αρχων εις προσελθων – Β
ιδου αρχων εισελθων – א^{c} C D E M X N W Σ Φ
ιδου αρχων εις ελθων – Κ S V Δ Π

Matthew 9:18

ελθων (upon coming) – (Δ) it^{q} cop^{bo}
τις ελθων (someone, upon coming) – Γ 1010 it^{(h),k}
εις ελθων (one, upon coming) – K M Y Π 33 565 579 892 𝔐 it^{(d),f} syr^{(s)} goth
εισελθων (upon entering) – ƒ^{1} 22 124 700 1071 1424
εις ελθων or εισελθων (one, upon coming or upon entering) – א^{2} C* D E N W X Θ
προσελθων (upon approaching) – א* L^{c} 69 157 cop^{sa}
τις προσελθων (someone, upon approaching) – C^{c} (F) G L* U ƒ^{13} 2 1006 it^{g^{1}}
εις προσελθων (one, upon approaching) – א^{1} B it^{a,b,c,ff^{1}} vg

Matthew 9:18

κυριε (sir) – M it^{f,ff^{1},h} vg^{mss}
text omitted – א D ƒ^{1} ƒ^{13} 33 892 it^{mss} vg^{mss}
οτι (that) – rell

Matthew 9:19

ηκολουθησαν (they followed) – E M syr^{p}
ηκολουθησεν (he followed) – B L W Θ ƒ^{1} ƒ^{13} 𝔐
ηκολουθει (he was following) – א C D 33 lat

Matthew 9:21

εαν αψωμαι (If I should touch) – א* it^{a,h} syr^{s}
εαν αψωμαι μονον (If I should touch only) – D lat
εαν μονον αψωμαι (If only I should touch) – rell

Matthew 9:22

Ιησους (Jesus) – omitted by א* D it syr^{s}

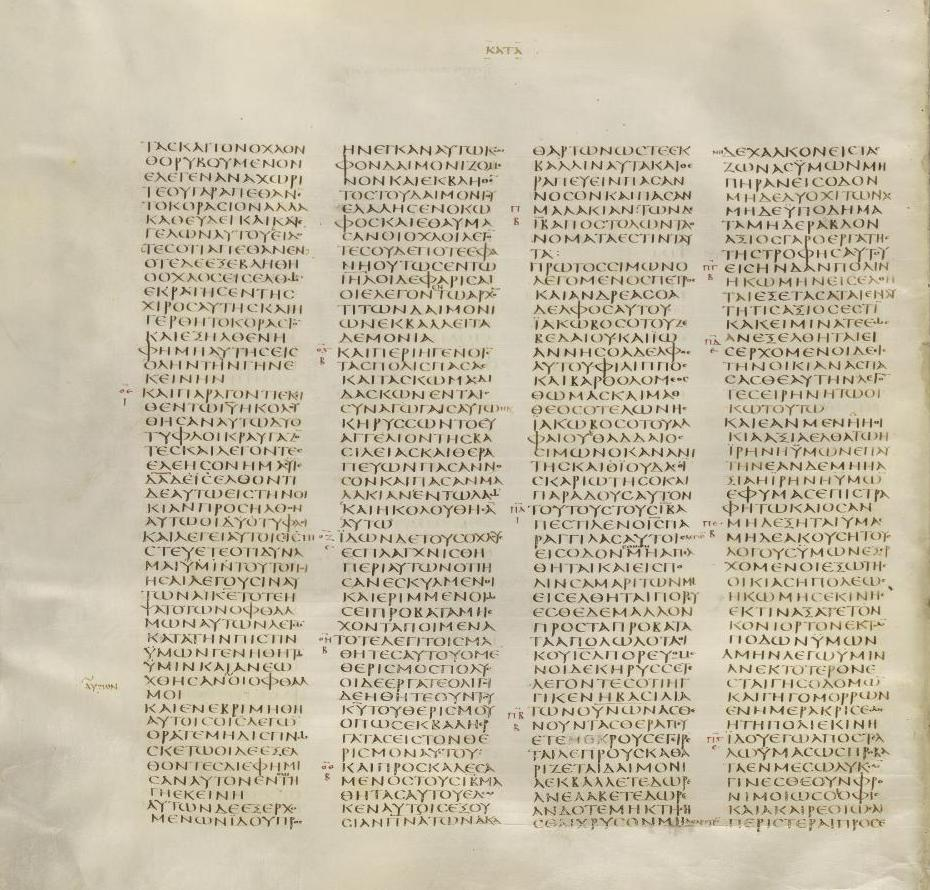
Sinaiticus, Matthew 9:23-10:17

Matthew 9:22

εστη στραφεις (standing, he turned) – D
επιστραφεις (turning around) – C L W Θ ƒ^{1} 𝔐
στραφεις (he turned) – א B N ƒ^{13} 33 892 1010 𝑙^{844} 𝑙^{2211}

Matthew 9:24

λεγει (he says) – N
λεγει αυτοις (he says to them) – C L W Θ 𝔐 it^{(f),(g^{1})} syr
ελεγεν (he was saying) – א B D ƒ^{1} ƒ^{13} 33 892 lat cop

Matthew 9:24

ειδοτες οτι απεθανεν – א 61
omit – B

Matthew 9:25

ελθων (upon coming) – D 1424 it
εισελθων (upon entering) – rell

Matthew 9:26

η φημη αὕτη αυτου (this report of him) – geo^{mss}
η φημη αυτου (the report of him) – D 1424 it^{d} cop^{sa,mae-2} eth^{mss} geo^{mss}
η φημη αυτης (the report of her) – א C^{c} N^{vid} Θ ƒ^{1} 33 124 157 1195* syr^{pal} cop^{bo,mae-1} eth^{ms}
η φημη αυτος (the same report) – C*
η φημη αὐτή (the same report) – L Γ 28
η φημη αυτη (this report or the same report) – B W Δ
η φημη αὕτη (this report) – Π ƒ^{13} 22 565 700 892 1009 1010 1071 1079 1195c 1216 1230 1242 1253 1365 1546 1646 2148 2174 𝔐 Lect lat syr^{s,p,h} arm goth geo^{mss} Diatessaron Augustine

Matthew 9:27a

ηκολουθησαν – Β D
ηκολουθησαν αυτω –א

Matthew 9:27b

κραυγαζοντες – א
κραζοντες – B

Matthew 9:27c

υιος – B G U Π
υιε – א

Matthew 9:28

οι δυο τυφλοι (the two blind men) – א* D it^{a,b,h} vg^{mss}
οι τυφλοι (the blind men) – rell

Matthew 9:28

και ερχεται (And he comes) – D
εισελθοντι δε αυτω (But, upon entering, he) – א* N (1424)
ελθοντος δε αυτου (But, upon coming, he) – 700 it^{f}
ελθοντι δε (But, upon coming) – rell

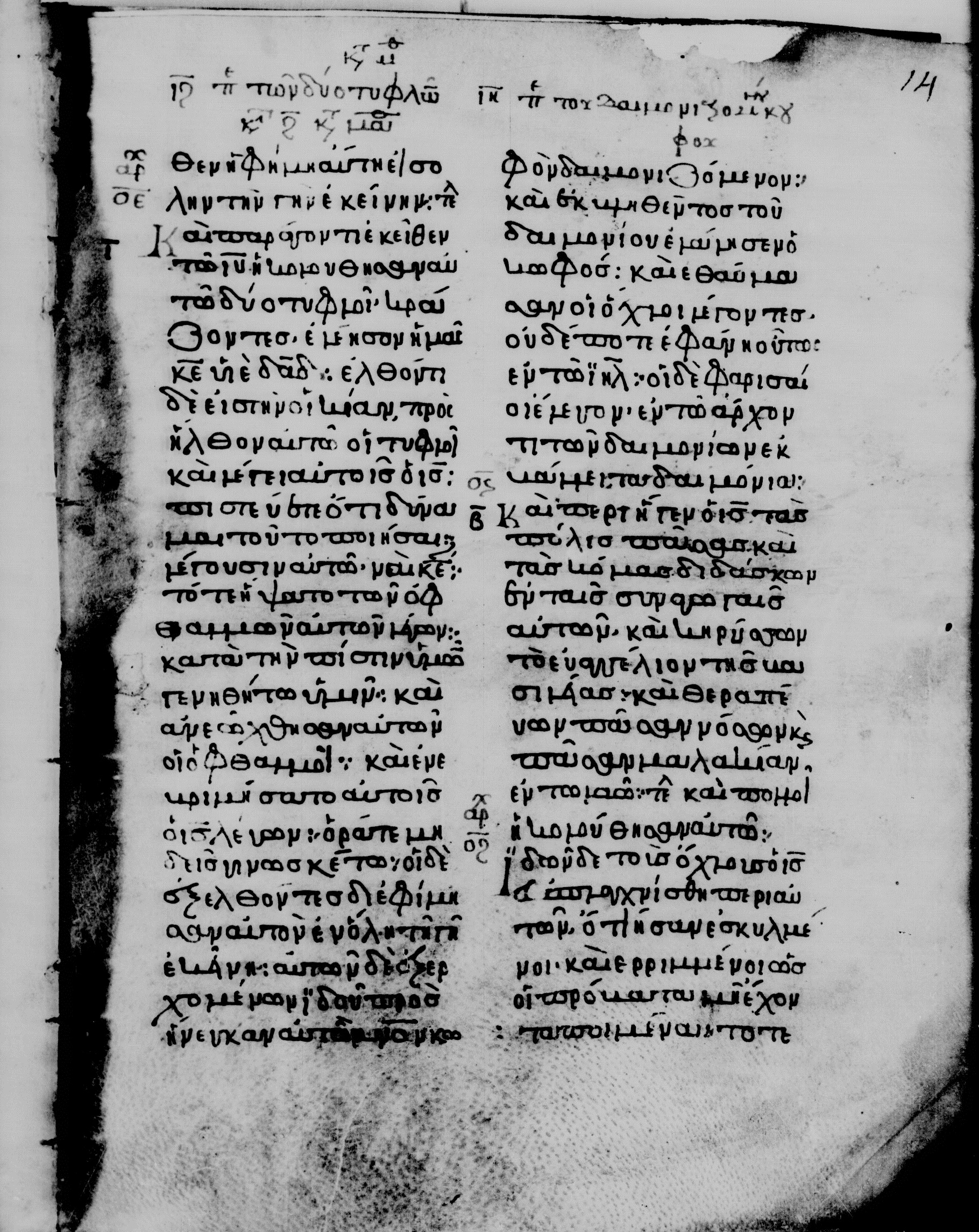
Codex 828 with text of Matthew 9:26-36

9:30a

ηνεωχυησαν – B D N Σ
ηνοιχθησαν – C
ανεωχθησαν –א

9:30b

οι οφθαλμοι – א
οι οφθαλμοι αυτων – D
αυτων οι οφθαλμοι – B

Matthew 9:31

εν τη γη εκεινη – א
εν ολη τη γη εκεινη – Β

Matthew 9:32

ανθρωπον (man) – omitted by א B ƒ^{13} 124 788 892 syr^{s,p} cop

Matthew 9:34

Verse omitted — D it^{a,d, k} syr^{s} Diatessaron Juvencus Hilary

Matthew 9:35

μαλακιαν εν τω λαω και πολλοι ηκολουθησαν αυτω (sickness among the people, and many followed him) – א^{1} L ƒ^{13} 517 1010 1424 it^{g^{1}}
μαλακιαν εν τω λαω και ηκολουθησαν αυτω (sickness among the people, and they followed him) – א*
μαλακιαν και πολλοι ηκολουθησαν αυτω (sickness, and many followed him) – it^{a,b,h}
μαλακιας αυτων τας εν αυτων (their sicknesses that were in them) – Codex Schøyen
μαλακιαν εν τω λαω (sickness among the people) – C^{3} E F G K X Γ Θ Π 28 579 700 788^{c} 𝔐^{mss} it^{c,g^{1}} vg^{mss} syr^{pal} arm geo
μαλακιαν (sickness) – א^{2} B C* D N S W Δ ƒ^{1} 22 33 157 209 565 788 892 𝔐^{mss} it^{mss} vg syr^{s,p,h} cop goth

Matthew 9:35

Minuscule 828 has additional reading εν τω λαω και πολλοι ηκολουθησαν αυτω

Matthew 9:36

ο Ιησους εσπλαγχνισθη (Jesus, brought to compassion) – C (G) N ƒ^{13} it^{(g^{1})} vg^{(mss)} syr^{p,h} cop^{mae-1}
εσπλαγχνισθη (he was brought to compassion) – rell

Matthew 9:36

εκλελυμενοι (wearied) – L 1424 it^{d} syr^{s,p}
εσκυλμενοι (troubled) – rell

31 Textual variants in Matthew 10

Matthew 10:1

μαλακιαν εν τω λαω (sickness among the people) – L it^{b,g^{1}}
μαλακιαν (sickness) – rell

Matthew 10:3

Θαδδαιος (Thaddaeus) – א B 17 124 130 788 892 𝑙^{185} 𝑙^{2211} it^{aur,c,ff^{1},l} vg cop Jerome Augustine
Λεββαιος (Lebbaeus) – D it^{d,(k),μ} Origen^{lat} Hesychius Augustine^{mss}
Θαδδαιος ο επικληθεις Λεββαιος (Thaddaeus who is surnamed Lebbaeus) – 13 346 543 826 828
Λεββαιος ο επικληθεις Θαδδαιος (Lebbaeus who is surnamed Thaddaeus) – C^{2} E F G K L N W X Δ Θ Π Σ ƒ^{1} 22 28 33 157 180 205 565 579 597 700 1006 1009 1010 1071 1079 1195 1216 1230 1242 1243 1253 1292 1342 1344 1365 1424 1505 1546 1646 2148 2174 Byz/𝔐 Lect it^{f} syr^{p,h,pal^{mss}} (arm) geo slav Apostolic Constitutions, Chrysostom
Λεββεδαιος ο επικληθεις Θαδδαιος (Lebbedaeus who is surnamed Thaddaeus) – eth
Λεββαιος ο και Θαδδαιος (Lebbaeus who is also Thaddaeus) – C*^{vid}
Iudas Zelotes (Judas the Zealot) – it^{a,b,g^{1},h,q} syr^{pal^{(mss)}}
Ιουδας ο και Λεββαιος ο επικληθεις Θαδδαιος (Judas who is also Lebbaeus who is surnamed Thaddaeus) – 243 854
text omitted – syr^{s} (but adds Judas the son of James in Matthew 10:4)

Matthew 10:4

Καναναιος (Cananaean) – B C L N ƒ^{1} 33 892 1010 lat cop
Χαναναιος (Chananaean) – D it^{d}
Κανανιτης (Canaanite) – א W Θ ƒ^{13} 28 𝔐 syr^{h}

Matthew 10:4

Ισκαριωτης (Iscariot) – א B K L W X Γ Δ Θ Π ƒ^{1} ƒ^{13} 28 33 565 700 892 1009 1010 1071 1079 1195 1216 1230 1242 1253 1344 1365 1546 1646 2148 2174 𝔐 Lect vg^{mss} syr^{h} cop Chrysostom
Ισκαριωθ (Iscariot) – C 1424 𝑙^{150}
Σκαριωτης (Scariot) – D it^{d,f,k,l} vg^{mss} syr^{s,p,pal^{mss}} arm geo
Scarioth – it^{a,b,c,ff^{1},g^{1},h}
Scariota – it^{q}
Carioth – it^{aur}
Σιμωνος Ισκαριωτου (Simon Iscariot's [son]) – Origen

Matthew 10:7

μετανοειτε οτι (Repent, because) – 251 cop^{sa^{mss}}
omit text – B syr^{s}
οτι (that) – rell

Matthew 10:8

νεκρους εγειρετε λεπρους καθαριζετε δαιμονια εκβαλλετε (raise the dead, cleanse the leprous, cast out demons) – א B C* N Σ Φ Ω 0281^{vid} ƒ^{1} ƒ^{13} 22 33 108 157 349 399 543 565 700^{mg} 892 1010 𝑙^{2211} it^{a,b,c,d,h,k,l,q} vg cop^{bo} eth geo^{mss} Hilary Chrysostom Cyril
νεκρους εγειρατε λεπρους καθαρεισατε και δαιμονια εκβαλετε (raise the dead, cleanse the leprous, and cast out demons) – D syr^{s}
λεπρους καθαριζετε δαιμονια εκβαλλετε νεκρους εγειρετε (cleanse the leprous, cast out demons, raise the dead) – P W Δ 566 1573 2145 syr^{h}
λεπρους καθαριζετε νεκρους εγειρετε δαιμονια εκβαλλετε (cleanse the leprous, raise the dead, cast out demons) – 16 348 372 1093 1579
λεπρους καθαριζετε δαιμονια εκβαλλετε (cleanse the leprous, cast out demons) – C^{c} E F G K L M S U V X Y Γ Θ Π 28 118 124 174 700* 788 𝔐 it^{f} syr^{(p),pal} cop^{sa,mae-1} arm eth^{mss} geo^{mss} Juvencus Eusebius Basil Jerome
δαιμονια εκβαλλετε λεπρους καθαριζετε – (cast out demons, cleanse the leprous) – 28
δαιμονια εκβαλλετε (cast out demons) – 1424*

Matthew 10:10

ραβδον (staff) – א B D Θ ƒ^{1} 33 892 1424 𝑙^{2211} lat syr^{s,p} cop Eusebius
ραβδους (staffs) – C L W ƒ^{13} 𝔐 Lect it^{a,ff^{1},h,μ} syr^{h} cop^{bo^{ms}}

Matthew 10:10

του μισθου αυτου (their wage) – K 565 892 it^{mss} syr^{h^{mg}}
της τροφης αυτου (their food) – rell

Matthew 10:11

η πολις εις ην αν εισελθητε εις αυτην (The city into which you^{pl} might enter, into it) – D it^{d}
εις ην δ’ αν πολιν εισελθητε (But into whichever city you^{pl} might enter) – ƒ^{1} 700 it^{a,b,ff^{1},h,k} syr^{s}
εις ην δ’ αν πολιν εισελθητε η κωμην (But into whichever city you^{pl} might enter, or a village) – L 0281 ƒ^{13} cop
εις ην δ’ αν πολιν η κωμην εισελθητε (But into whichever city or village you^{pl} might enter) – א B C W 𝔐 Lect it^{aur,c,f,g^{1},l,q} vg syr^{p,h} rell

Matthew 10:12

ασπασασθε αυτην λεγοντες ειρηνη τω οικω τουτω (greet it, saying, "Peace unto this house") – א^{*,2} D L W Θ ƒ^{1} 22 346 517 713 1010 (1424) it vg^{mss} arm
ασπασασθε αυτην (greet it) – א^{1} B C ƒ^{13} 𝔐 Lect it^{k,l} vg^{mss} syr cop rell

Matthew 10:12

λεγοντες ειρηνη τω οικω τουτω – Sinaiticus*^{,2}, D, L, W, Θ, f^{1} 1010 (1424), it vg^{cl}
αυτην – majority of mss

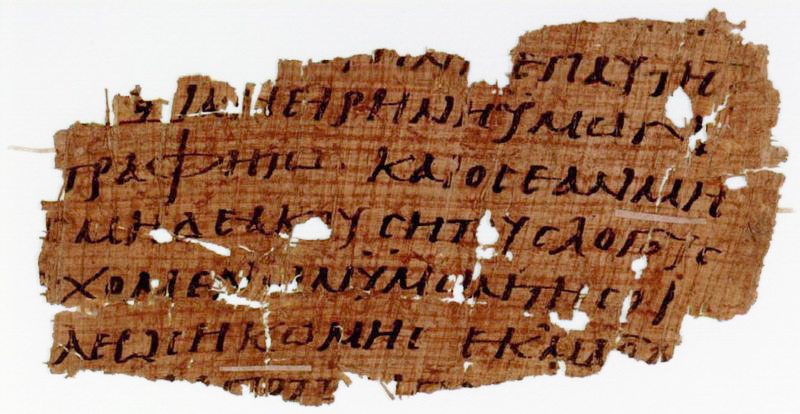
Matthew 10:13-15 in 𝔓^{110}

Matthew 10:13

εφ’ (upon) – א B W 892 1010 𝑙^{2211}
προς (toward) – rell

Matthew 10:14

της οικιας η (that house or) – omitted by D arm

Matthew 10:14

πολεως η κωμης (city or village) – 𝔓^{110} א (0281) ƒ^{13} 892 vg^{mss} cop
πολεως (city) – rell

Matthew 10:14

εκ των ποδων υμων (out of your feet) – א C 0281 33 892 lat
απο των ποδων υμων (away from your feet) – 𝔓^{110}
των ποδων υμων (of your feet) – rell

Matthew 10:16

ο οφις (the serpent) – א* Origen^{pt} Epiphanius
οι οφεις (the serpents) – rell

Matthew 10:16

απλουστατοι (simple) – D
ακεραιοι (innocent) – rell

Matthew 10:18

επι ηγεμονων σταθησεσθε (you^{pl} will be caused to stand before governors) – D (0171) it^{(mss)}
επι βασιλεις δε και ηγεμονας στησεσθε (But you^{pl} will be caused to stand before kings and governors) – syr^{s}
επι ηγεμονας δε και βασιλεις αχθησεσθε (But you^{pl} will be lead before governors and kings) – rell

Matthew 10:19

πως η (how or) – omitted by it^{a,b,ff^{1},k} syr^{s,pal} Cyprian Epiphanius Augustine

Matthew 10:19

δοθησεται γαρ υμιν εν εκεινη τη ωρα τι λαλησητε (for it will be given to you^{pl} in that hour what you^{pl} should speak) – omitted by D L it^{g^{1},k} vg^{mss} Epiphanius

Matthew 10:23

φευγετε εις την ετεραν (flee into a different one) – א B W 33 265 333 423 492 527^{c} 719 822 892 900 935 936 1020 1192 1227 1253 1289 1424 1532 1541 1602 2147 2372 𝑙^{813} Origen^{pt}, Peter of Alexandria, Eusebius Athanasius, Apostolic Constitutions, Chrysostom^{lem} Socrates^{pt} Cyril Theodoret^{mss}
φευγετε εις την αλλην (flee into another) – C E F G K N X Δ Π Σ Φ 28 157 180 372 579 597 700 1006 1009 1010 1071 1079 1195 1216 1230 1242 1243 1292 1342 1344 1365 1505 1546 1646 2148 2174 2737 𝔐 Lect Clement Origen^{mss} Basil, Apostolic Constitutions, Socrates^{pt}
φευγετε εις την ετεραν or φευγετε εις την αλλην (flee into a different one or flee into another) – it^{aur,c,f,l} vg syr^{s,p,h} cop arm eth goth geo^{mss} slav Ambrose Jerome Augustine
φευγετε εις την ετεραν καν εκ ταυτης διωκωσιν υμας φευγετε εις την αλλην (flee into a different one, and if they may persecute you^{pl} out of this one, flee into another) – ƒ^{1} ƒ^{13} 22 23 134 188 205 375 (828) 1166 1595 Diatessaron^{arm}
φευγετε εις την αλλην καν εκ ταυτης διωκωσιν υμας φευγετε εις την ετεραν (flee into another, and if they may persecute you^{pl} out of this one, flee into a different one) – (L) Θ 163 247 934 1193 1229 1314 1353* 1678 2118 2660 2701^{supp} 2786 Origen^{(pt)}
φευγετε εις την αλλην καν εκ ταυτης διωκωσιν υμας φευγετε εις την αλλην (flee into another, and if they may persecute you^{pl} out of this one, flee into another) – 565 2145^{c}
φευγετε εις την αλλην εαν δε εν τη αλλη διωκουσιν υμας φευγετε εις την αλλην (flee into another, but if they are persecuting you^{pl} in the other, flee into another) – D (0171)^{vid} it^{d} Origen^{(pt)}
One of the four latter variants from above – it^{a,b,}ff^{1},g^{1},(h),(k),q vg^{mss} geo^{mss} Diatessaron^{mss} Hilary Petilianus

Matthew 10:25

βελζεβουλ (Belzebul) – D it^{d}
βεελζεβουλ (Beelzebul) – 𝔓^{110} C (L) W Θ ƒ^{1} ƒ^{13} 33 𝔐 Lect it^{mss} syr^{h} cop Cyprian
βεεζεβουλ (Beezebul) – א B
Βεελζεβυβ (Beelzebub) – it^{c,(ff^{1})} vg syr^{s,p}

Matthew 10:35

υιον (son) – D it syr^{s,c}
ανθρωπον (man) – rell

Matthew 10:37

και ο φιλων υιον η θυγατερα υπερ εμε ουκ εστιν μου αξιος (and the one loving son or daughter more than me is not worthy of me) – omitted by 𝔓^{19} B* D 983 1009 𝑙^{871} it^{d} syr^{h} Codex Schøyen

Matthew 10:38

Verse omitted – 𝔓^{19} M*

Matthew 10:38

μου μαθητες (my disciple) – it^{c,k} Cyprian
μου αδελφος (my brother) – Clement
μου αξιος (worthy of me) – rell

Matthew 10:39

ο ευρων την ψυχην αυτου απολεσει αυτην και (The one finding his life will lose it, and) – omitted by א*

Matthew 10:41

και ο δεχομενος δικαιον εις ονομα δικαιου μισθον δικαιου λημψεται (and the one receiving a righteous man in the name of a righteous man will receive a righteous man's reward) – omitted by D

Matthew 10:42

ελαχιστων τουτων (of the least of these) – D latt
μικρων τουτων των ελαχιστων (of the least of these little ones) – 1424
μικρων τουτων (of these little ones) – rell

Matthew 10:42

ποτηριον ψυχρου (a cold cup) – E* geo^{mss}
ποτηριον ψυχρου μονον (a cold cup only) – 𝔓^{19} א B C K L P W Δ Θ Π ƒ^{1} ƒ^{13} 28 700 892 1009 1079 1195 1230 1253 1365 1546 1646 2174 𝔐 Lect it^{k} syr^{p,h,pal^{mss}}
ποτηριον ψυχρον μονον (a cold cup only) – M X Z 2* 33 157 565 1010 1071 1216 1242 1344 2148 𝑙^{184} 𝑙^{1231} 𝑙^{1663}
ποτηριον υδατος ψυχρου (a cup of cold water) – D it^{d} syr^{s,c} cop eth^{mss} (Clement) Origen^{pt} Cyprian Hilary Augustine
ποτηριον υδατος ψυχρου μονον (a cup of cold water only) – lat syr^{pal^{mss}} arm goth eth^{mss} geo^{mss} Origen^{pt}

Matthew 10:42

ου μη αποληται ο μισθος αυτου (his reward should not in any way be lost) – D it^{a,b,c,d,g^{1},h,k,q} syr^{s,c} cop^{bo,mae-2} Cyprian
ου μη απολεση τον μισθον αυτου (he should not lose his reward) – rell

26 Textual variants in Matthew 11

Matthew 11:1

δωδεκα (twelve) – omitted by ƒ^{1} 22 Codex Schøyen

Matthew 11:2

Ιησου (Jesus) – D 047 0233 7 99 262 348 349 483 484 517 659 954 1071 1216 1424 1579 1604 𝑙^{241} it^{d} syr^{c} eth Origen Chrysostom
κυριου ημων (our lord) – syr^{s}
omit text – Codex Schøyen
Χριστου (Christ) – rell

Matthew 11:2

δια των μαθητων αυτου (through his disciples) – א B C* D P W Z Δ Θ Π^{c} Σ 0233 ƒ^{13} 33 124 174 788 𝑙^{844} 𝑙^{2211} it^{d,q} syr^{p,h} cop^{sa,mae-1} arm slav Origen^{pt}
δυο των μαθητων αυτου (two of his disciples) – C^{c} E F G L X ƒ^{1} 13 22 28 157 180 205 565 579 597 700 828 892 1006 1010 1071 1243 1292 1342 1424 1505 𝔐 Lect it^{aur,ff^{1},g^{1},l} vg syr^{h^{mg},pal} cop^{bo} geo^{mss} goth Origen^{pt} Chrysostom Jerome^{pt} Augustine
των μαθητων αυτου (his disciples) – it^{a,b,c,f,h,k} vg^{ms} syr^{s,c} geo^{(mss)} Hilary Jerome^{pt}

Matthew 11:3

εργαζομενος (works) – D*
ερχομενος (comes) – rell

Matthew 11:5

και χωλοι περιπατουσιν (and the lame are walking) – omitted by D it^{d} Clement

Matthew 11:5

και πτωχοι ευαγγελιζονται (and the poor are being evangelized) — omitted by it^{k} syr^{s} Diatessaron^{(syr)} Clement

Matthew 11:7

και μετα ταυτα (And after these things) – syr^{s}
τουτων δε πορευομενων (But these were going) – rell

Matthew 11:8

αλλα τι εξηλθατε ανθρωπον ιδειν (Moreover, why did you^{pl} go out? To see a man...) – א*
αλλα τι εξηλθατε ιδειν ανθρωπον (Moreover, what did you^{pl} go out to see? A man...) – rell

Matthew 11:8

εν μαλακοις (in delicacies) – א B D Z it^{a,aur,c,d,ff^{1},g^{1},k,q} vg
εν μαλακοις ιματιοις (in delicate garments) – C L P W X Δ Θ 0233 ƒ^{1} ƒ^{13} 22 33 𝔐 Lect it^{b,f,h,l} syr cop goth

Matthew 11:9

αλλα τι εξηλθατε προφητην ιδειν (Moreover, why did you^{pl} go out? To see a prophet?) – א* B^{1} W Z 0281 892 cop^{bo,mae} eth^{mss} Origen^{pt} Chrysostom^{pt}
αλλα τι εξηλθατε ιδειν προφητην (Moreover, what did you^{pl} go out to see? A prophet?) – א^{1} B^{(*),2} C D E F G K L N O^{vid} P X Δ Θ Π Σ 0233 ƒ^{1} ƒ^{13} 28 33 157 180 205 565 579 597 700 1006 1009 1010 1071 1079 1195 1216 1230 1242 1243 1253 1292 1342 1365 1424 1505 1546 1646 2148 2174 𝔐 Lect latt syr cop^{sa} goth arm eth^{mss} geo slav Diatessaron^{arm} Origen^{pt} Ambrosiaster Hilary Chrysostom^{pt} Jerome Augustine Cyril

Matthew 11:13

και ο νομος (and the Law) – omitted by syr^{s} cop^{bo^{ms}}

Matthew 11:15

ωτα (ears) – B D 174 700 it^{d,k} syr^{s}
ωτα ακουειν (ears to hear) – א C E F G K L N W X Z Δ Θ Π Σ ƒ^{1} ƒ^{13} 28 33 157 180 205 565 579 597 892 1006 1009 1010 1071 1079 1195 1216 1230 1242 1243 1253 1292 1342 1365 1424 1505 1546 1646 2148 2174 𝔐 Lect lat syr cop arm eth geo slav goth^{vid} Diatessaron^{arm} Justin Clement Origen Chrysostom Jerome

Matthew 11:16

ετεροις (to others) – א B D Z^{vid} ƒ^{1} 28 892 it^{mss}
ετεροις αυτων (to their others) – C L W Θ ƒ^{13} 𝔐^{pt}
εταιροις (to friends) – G 565 700 1010 it^{aur,ff^{1},l} vg Hippolytus Origen
εταιροις αυτων (to their friends) – syr cop^{sa} 𝔐^{pt}

Matthew 11:17

εθρηνησαμεν (we lamented) – א B D Z ƒ^{1} 47 54 67 248 279 372 535 892 1061 1068* 1132 1254 1543 2586 2623 2737 𝑙^{48} 𝑙^{211^{pt}} 𝑙^{292} it^{aur,c,d,f,ff^{1},g^{1},k,l} vg^{mss} cop goth geo^{mss} Clement Gregory Chrysostom^{pt} Augustine^{pt}
εθρηνησαμεν υμιν (we lamented to you^{pl}) – C E F G K L N W X Δ Θ Π Σ Φ ƒ^{13} 22 28 33 118 157 180 205 565 579 597 700 1006 1009 1010^{c} 1071 1079 1195 1216 1230 1242 1243 1253 1292 1342 1365 1424 1505 1546 1582^{c} 1646 2148 2174 𝔐 Lect it^{a,b,ff^{2},h,q} vg^{mss} syr arm eth geo^{mss} slav Diatessaron Gregory^{mss} Didymus Chrysostom^{pt} Jerome Augustine^{pt} Hesychius

Matthew 11:18

ηλθεν γαρ προς υμας Ιωαννης (For John came unto you^{pl}) – (L) Θ ƒ^{13} 517 1675 syr^{(s),c,h} Codex Schøyen^{vid} Eusebius
ηλθεν γαρ Ιωαννης (For John came) – rell

Matthew 11:19

εργων αυτης (her deeds) – א B* W 124 202 788 1319 2145 syr^{p,h} cop^{sa^{mss},bo} eth^{mss} slav^{mss} Origen^{pt} (Apollinaris) Jerome^{mss}
τεκνων αυτης (her children) – B^{c} C D E F G K L N X Δ Θ Π Σ Φ ƒ^{1} 13 22 28 33 157 174 180 205 346 543 565 579 597 700 826 828 892 983 1006 1009 1010 1071 1079 1195 1216 1230 1242 1243 1253 1292 1342 1344 1365 1424 1505 1546 1646 2148 2174 2680 𝔐 Lect latt syr^{s,c,h^{mg}} cop^{sa^{mss},mae-1} goth arm eth^{mss} geo slav^{mss} Diatessaron Irenaeus^{lat} Origen^{pt} Hilary Ambrose Epiphanius Chrysostom Jerome Augustine
τεκνων αυτων (its children) – 165 1536 2290

Matthew 11:20

Τοτε ηρξατο ο Ιησους ονειδιζειν (Then Jesus began to reproach) – C K L N W Θ ƒ^{1} ƒ^{13} 565 579 892 𝔐^{pt} it^{g^{1},h} vg^{mss} syr co^{sa^{mss}}
Τοτε ηρξατο ονειδιζειν (Then he began to reproach) – rell

Matthew 11:21

Χοραζιν και Βηθσαιδα (Chorazin and Bethsaida!) – D it
Χοραζιν ουαι σοι Βηθσαιδα (Chorazin! Woe to you, Bethsaida!) – rell

Matthew 11:21

καθημενοι μετενοησαν (seated, repented) – א C 33
καθημεναι μετενοησαν (seated, repented) – Δ ƒ^{1} 892 1424 syr^{h}
μετενοησαν (repented) – rell

Matthew 11:23

και συ, Καφαρναουμ, μη εως ουρανου υψωθηση (And you, Capernaum, will not be raised up unto heaven) – א B* C* D W Θ 372 1253 it^{a,aur,b,c,d,ff^{1},ff^{2},(k),(l)} vg syr^{c} co arm eth geo Irenaeus^{lat} Gaudentius Jerome^{mss}
και συ, Καφαρναουμ, μη εως του ουρανου υψωθηση (And you, Capernaum, will not be raised up unto the heaven) – C^{c} Y ƒ^{1} 22
και συ, Καφαρναουμ, η εως ουρανου υψωθηση (And you, Capernaum, who unto heaven [you think] you will be raised) – B^{c}
και συ, Καφαρναουμ, η εως του ουρανου υψωθησει (And you, Capernaum, will you be raised up unto the heaven?) – L Jerome^{ms}
και συ, Καπερναουμ, η εως του ουρανου υψωθεισα (And you, Capernaum, who is elevated unto the heaven) – K M N Π* Σ 33 565 579 892 983 1009 1071 1079 1195 1216 1242 1243 1424 1505 1546 1582^{c} 1646 𝔐^{pt} Lect it^{h} syr^{s,p,h} (slav) Caesarius Chrysostom^{pt} Jerome^{ms}
και συ, Καπερναουμ, η εως ουρανου υψωθεισα (And you, Capernaum, who is elevated unto heaven) – X Δ 124 157 597 1230 1292
και συ, Καπερναουμ, η εως του ουρανου υψωθησ (And you, Capernaum, you who would be raised up unto the heaven) – E F G S U V Y Γ Π^{mg} 13 118 180 205 209 700 (828) 1006 1010 1342 1344 1364 2174 𝔐^{pt} it^{f,(g^{1}),q} Chrysostom^{pt} Maximus Jerome^{mss}
και συ, Καπερναουμ, εως ουρανου υψωθησ (And you, Capernaum, would be raised up unto heaven) – 2148
και συ, Καπερναουμ, η εως ουρανου υψωθησ (And you, Capernaum, you who would be raised up unto heaven) – 28 788

Matthew 11:23

καταβηση (you will descend) – B D W 163 372 2680 2737 latt syr^{s,c} cop^{sa} goth arm eth geo slav Irenaeus^{lat} Caesarius Jerome
καταβιβασθηση (you will be brought down) – א C E F G K L N X Y Δ Θ Π Σ Φ ƒ^{1} ƒ^{13} 22 28 33 157 180 205 565 579 597 700 892 1006 1009 1010 1071 1079 1195 1216 1230 1242 1243 1253 1292 1342 1344 1365 1424 1505 1546 1646 2148 2174 𝔐 Lect syr^{p,h} cop^{bo,mae-1} Gaudentius Chrysostom Pelagius

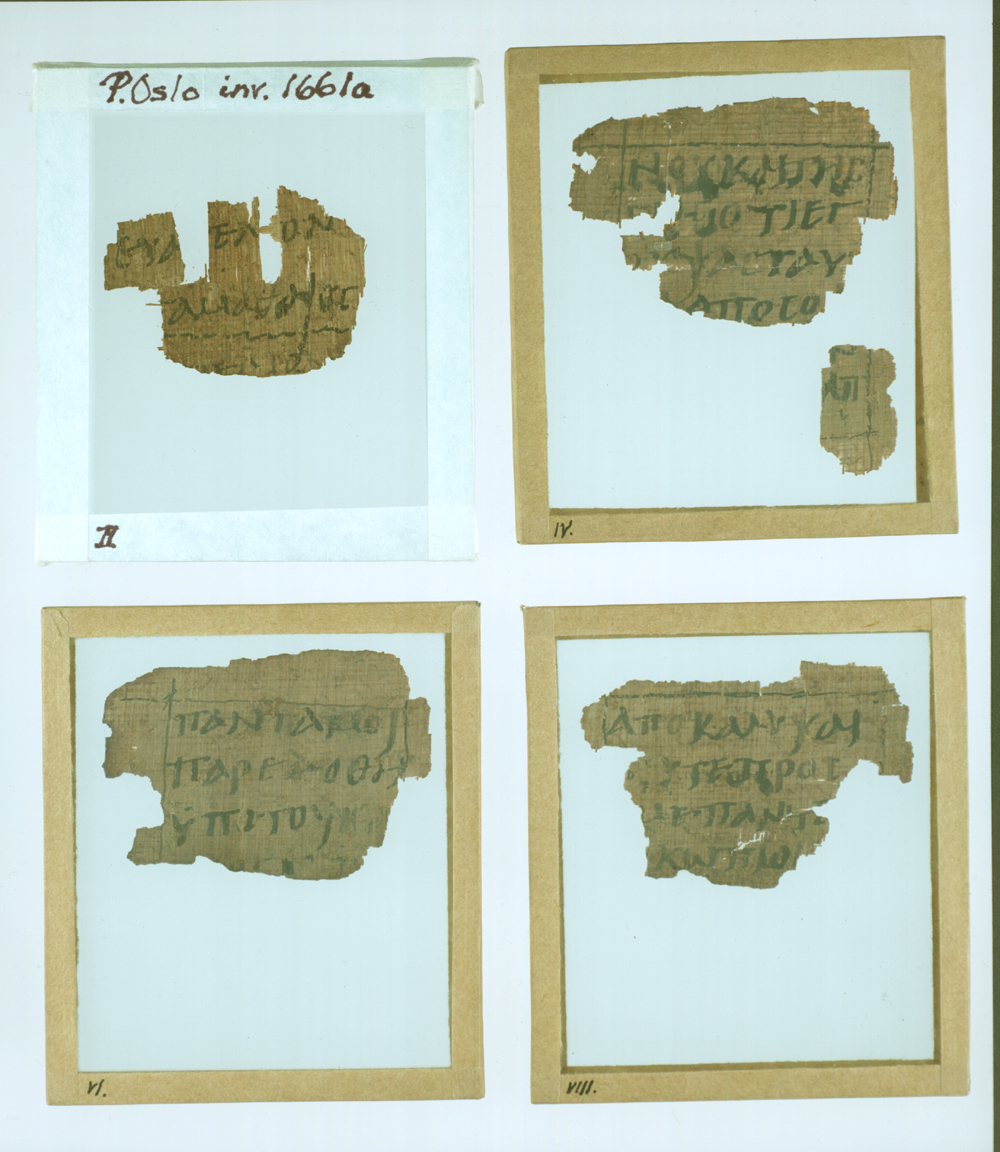
Matthew 11:25-30 from Papyrus 62

Matthew 11:25

και συνετων (and intelligent) – omitted by syr^{s,c} Hilary Augustine^{vid}

Matthew 11:25

εκρυψας – 𝔓^{62}, Sinaiticus, B, D, 33, ℓ 2211
απεκρυψας – C L W Θ f^{1,13} Byz

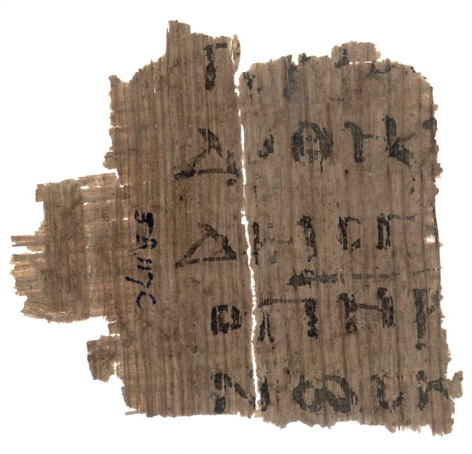
Matthew 11:26-27 from Papyrus 70

Matthew 11:27

του πατρος (the father) – א* cop^{sa^{ms},bo} Justin Marcosians
του πατρος μου (my father) – rell

Matthew 11:27

ουδεις επιγινωσκει τον πατερα ει μη ο υιος ουδε τον υιον ει μη ο πατηρ (no one intimately knows the father except the son, nor the son except the father) – N X Diatessaron^{(syr),arm} Marcus Justin Irenaeus^{pt} Eusebius^{(pt)} (Ephraem) Adamantius (Marcellus) Didymus^{pt} (Pseudo-Clementines) Epiphanius^{(pt)} Severian (John)
ουδεις επιγινωσκει τις εστιν ο υιος ει μη ο πατηρ ουδε τον πατερα τις επιγινωσκει ει μη ο υιος (no one intimately knows someone is the son except the father, nor the father someone intimately knows except the son) – 1010
ουδεις επιγινωσκει τον υιον ει μη ο πατηρ ουδε τον πατερα τις επιγινωσκει (no one intimately knows the son except the father, nor the father someone intimately knows) – 1505*
ουδεις επιγινωσκει τον υιον ει μη ο πατηρ ουδε τον πατερα τις επιγινωσκει ει μη ο υιος (no one intimately knows the son except the father, nor the father [does] someone intimately know except the son) – rell

Matthew 11:29

μαθετε (learn) – א* 245 1010
μαθετε απ’ εμου (learn from me) – rell

27 Textual variants in Matthew 12

Matthew 12:1

σταχυας και ταις χερσιν αυτων ψωχειν (grain heads and rubbing them with their hands) – it^{(c)} syr^{c}
σταχυας (grain heads) – rell

Matthew 12:2

τι οι μαθηται σου (Why do your disciples) – it^{(c)} syr^{s,c}
ιδου οι μαθηται σου (Look, your disciples) – rell

Matthew 12:2

εν σαββατω (on a Sabbath) — omitted by it^{ff^{1},k} syr^{s,c}

Matthew 12:4

ελαβεν (he took) – 892* Ambrosiaster
εφαγον (they ate) – א B 481
εφαγεν (he ate) – rell

Matthew 12:4

ο ουκ εξον ην (which was not permissible) – 𝔓^{70} B D W ƒ^{13} 22 it^{aur,ff^{2*},k,q} syr^{p} arm
ους ουκ εξον ην (which^{pl} was not permissible) – א C E G K L Θ 0233 ƒ^{1} (33) 565 892 𝔐 Lect lat syr^{h} cop

Matthew 12:4

αλλ’ η τοις ιερευσιν (but rather the priests) – ƒ^{1} 22
ει μη τοις ιερευσιν μονοις (except the chief priests alone) – rell

Matthew 12:9

εκειθεν ο Ιησους (from there, Jesus) – C N Σ it^{c,g^{1},h} syr^{p}
εκειθεν (from there) – rell

Matthew 12:10

τοις σαββασιν θεραπευσαι (to heal on the Sabbaths) – omitted by syr^{s}

Matthew 12:12

μαλλον διαφερει (more valuable) – Θ ƒ^{13} 33 157 517 565 713 1424 1675 lat syr^{s,c} cop^{mae}
διαφερει (better) – rell

Matthew 12:13

απεκατεσταθη υγιης (it was restored healthy) – א C^{c} 892*
απεκατεσταθη ως η αλλη (it was restored, like the other) – it^{b,c,ff^{1},g^{1}h} syr^{s,c,p} arm
απεκατεσταθη η χειρ αυτου υγιης ως η αλλη (his hand was restored, healthy like the other) – 118 209 983 1424 1689 𝑙^{184}
απεκατεσταθη υγιης ως η αλλη (it was restored, healthy like the other) – rell

Matthew 12:15

πολλοι (many) – א B Π^{c} 372 873 lat syr^{(s),(c)} eth^{mss} Eusebius^{pt} (Chromatius) Jerome Augustine
οχλοι (crowds) – N* cop^{sa^{mss}}
πολλοι οχλοι (many crowds) – X 0211 0233 1194 2680 eth^{mss} Hilary
οχλοι πολλοι (many crowds) – C D E G K L N^{c} W Δ Θ Π* Σ 0281 ƒ^{1} ƒ^{13} 28 33 157 180 205 565 579 700 892 1006 1009 1010 1071 1079 1195 1216 1230 1242 1243 1253 1292 1342 1344 1365 1424 1505 1546 1646 2148 2174 𝔐 Lect it^{d,f,h,(q)} syr^{p,h} cop^{sa^{ms},bo} arm eth^{(mss)} geo slav Diatessaron Origen Eusebius^{pt} (Hilary) Chrysostom

Matthew 12:16

και επετιμα αυτοις (And he was reprimanding them) – Θ
δε ους εθεραπευσεν επεπληξεν αυτοις (But whoever he healed, he rebuked) – D ƒ^{(1)} it
δε ους εθεραπευσεν επεπληξεν αυτοις και επετιμησεν αυτοις (But whoever he healed, he rebuked them and reprimanded them) – W
και επετιμησεν αυτοις (And he reprimanded them) – rell

Matthew 12:22

ωστε τον κωφον (so that the deaf-mute) – א B D 892 983 1424 it^{ff^{1},g^{1},k} syr^{s,c} cop
ωοτε τον κωφον και τυφλον (so that the deaf-mute and blind) – L W X Δ Θ 0233 ƒ^{1} ƒ^{13} 517 700 713 𝑙^{844} 𝑙^{2211} syr^{p,h} Basil
ωστε τον τυφλον και κωφον (so that the blind and deaf-mute) – C 0281 22 33 565 𝔐 Lect it^{q}
text omitted – lat

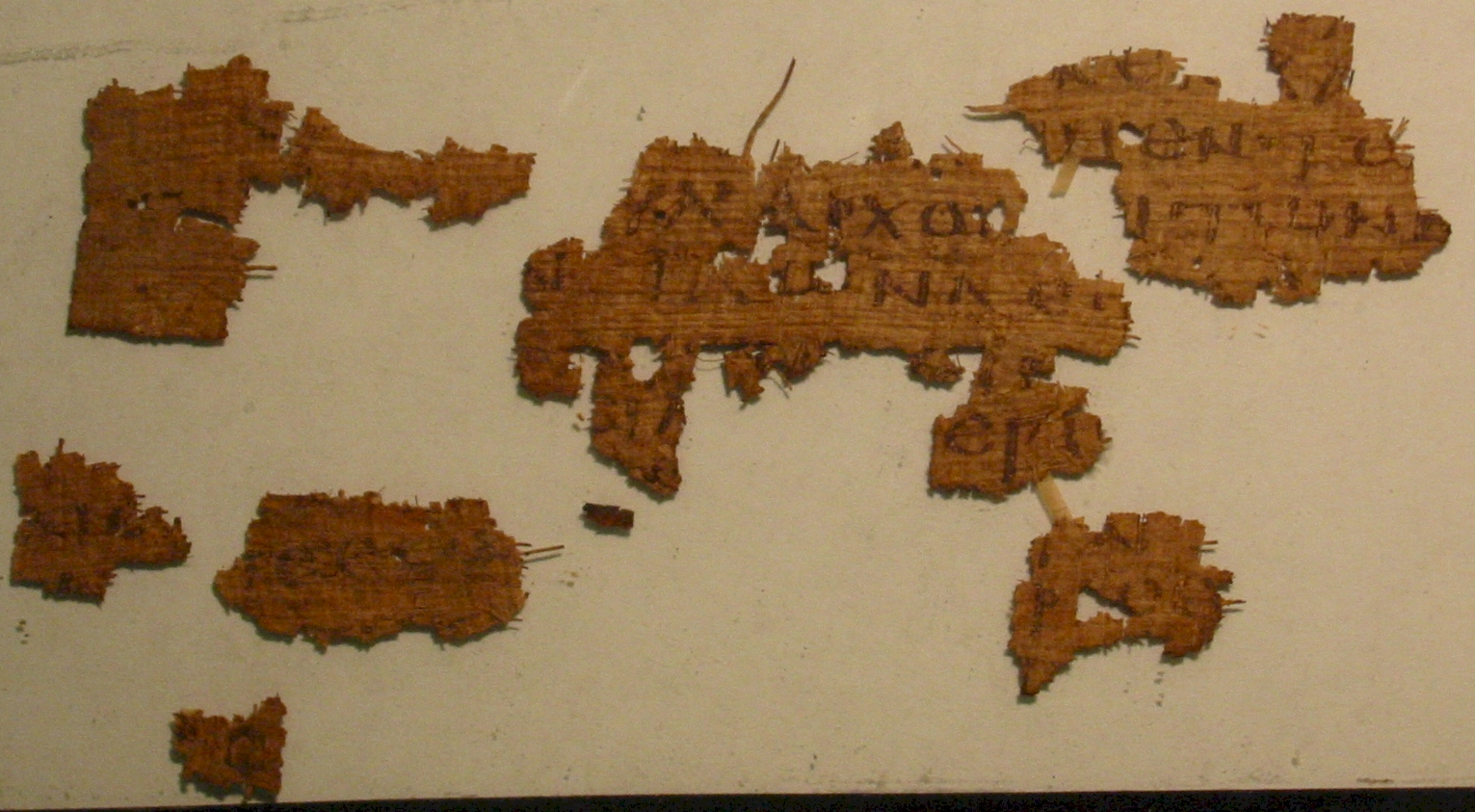
Matthew 12:24-26 from Papyrus 21

Matthew 12:24 (also Matthew 12:27)

Βεεζεβουλ (Beezeboul) — א B
Belzebul — it^{d}
Beelzebub or Baalzebub — it^{c,(ff^{1})} vg syr^{s,c,p}
Βεελζεβουλ (Beelzeboul) — 𝔓^{21} C (D) (L) W Θ 0281 ƒ^{1} ƒ^{13} 33 𝔐/Byz Lect it^{mss} syr^{h} (cop) Origen

Matthew 12:25

ο Ιησους (Jesus) — omitted by 𝔓^{21} א B D 892* 𝑙^{387} it^{d,(k)} syr^{s,c} cop^{sa,bo^{mss}} slav^{mss} Chrysostom^{pt}

Matthew 12:29

διαρπασαι (plunders) – א C^{c} D L Θ ƒ^{13} 𝔐 Lect syr^{c}
αρπασαι (seizes) – B C* N W ƒ^{1} 892 1424

Matthew 12:30

σκορπιζει (is scattering) – B C D K L W X Δ Θ Π ƒ^{1} ƒ^{13} 28 565 700 892 1009 1010 1071 1079 1195 1216 1230 1242 1253 1344 1365 1546 1582^{c} 1646 2148 2174 𝔐 Lect lat syr cop^{sa} arm geo
σκορπιζει με (is scattering me) – א 33 1582* syr^{h^{mg}} cop^{bo} eth Origen Athanasius Chrysostom
διαρπαστω (is plundering) – 𝑙^{185}
omit text – it^{k}

Matthew 12:31

βλασφημια αφεθησεται υμιν τοις ανθρωποις (blasphemy will be forgiven to you^{pl} by men) – B ƒ^{1} 22 syr^{pal^{mss}} cop^{sa,mae-1} Origen Athanasius
βλασφημια αφεθησεται αυτοις τοις ανθρωποις (blasphemy will be forgiven to them by men) – eth^{mss}
βλασφημια αφεθησεται (blasphemy will be forgiven) – syr^{pal^{mss}}
βλασφημια αφεθησεται τοις ανθρωποις (blasphemy will be forgiven to men) – rell

Matthew 12:31

ουκ αφεθησεται (will not be forgiven) – א B ƒ^{1} 22 174 517 892 1424 1675 it^{aur,k} vg cop^{sa,bo,mae-2}
ουκ αφεθησεται αυτω (will not be forgiven to him) – it^{(b),ff^{1},h} syr^{s,c} cop^{bo^{ms},mae-1}
ουκ αφεθησεται τοις ανθρωποις (will not be forgiven to men) – C D L W Θ 0271 ƒ^{13} 33 𝔐 Lect it^{mss} syr^{p,h}

Matthew 12:32

κατα του υιου του ανθρωπου ουκ αφεθησεται αυτω (against the Son of Man, it will not be forgiven to him) – B*
κατα του υιου του ανθρωπου αφεθησεται αυτω (against the Son of Man, it will be forgiven to him) – rell

Matthew 12:32

κατα του πνευματος του αγιου ου μη αφεθησεται αυτω (against the Holy Spirit, it will not in any way be forgiven to him) – א*
κατα του πνευματος του αγιου ου μη αφεθη αυτω (against the Holy Spirit, may it not in any way be forgiven to him) – B
κατα του πνευματος του αγιου ουκ αφεθησεται αυτω (against the Holy Spirit, it will not be forgiven to him) – rell

Matthew 12:34

το στομα λαλει αγαθα (the mouth is speaking good things) – D* it^{d}
το στομα λαλει (the mouth is speaking) – rell

Matthew 12:35

εκ του αγαθου θησαυρου της καρδιας αυτου (out of the good treasure of his heart) – L ƒ^{1} 33 it^{aur,(f)} vg^{mss} syr^{(s),(c)}
εκ του αγαθου θησαυρου (out of his good treasure) – rell

Matthew 12:38

και Φαρισαιων (and of the Pharisees) – omitted by B

Matthew 12:44

ευρισκει τον οικον (he finds the house) – D syr^{h^{(mg)}}
ευρισκει αυτον (he finds it) – it^{c,ff^{2},h} vg^{mss} cop^{mae}
ευρισκει (he finds) – rell

Matthew 12:46

ζητουντες αυτω λαλησαι (seeking to speak to him) – omitted by א*

Matthew 12:47

verse omitted — א* B L Γ 579 597 1009 𝑙^{12} 𝑙^{387} it^{ff^{1},k} syr^{s,c} cop^{sa,mae-2}

34 Textual variants in Matthew 13

Matthew 13:1

της οικιας (of the house) – B Θ ƒ^{1} ƒ^{13} 7 124 164 335 517 788 805 939 1201 1266 1424 1443 1554 1555 1651 1675 1823* 2487 2555 2586 Origen
εκ της οικιας (out of the house) – א Z 33 295 494 892 1342 1695 it^{c,f,h,l,q} vg
απο της οικιας (out from the house) – C E F G K L W Y Π 22 28 565 𝔐
text omitted – D it^{a,b,d,e,k,g^{1},ff^{1},ff^{2},g^{1},k} syr^{s}

Matthew 13:4

ηλθεν τα πετεινα και (the birds came^{sg} and) – א C W f^{1} 𝔐
ηλθον τα πετεινα και (the birds came^{pl} and) – D L Z 33 565
ελθοντα τα πετεινα (upon coming, the birds) – B
ελθοντα τα πετεινα του ουρανου (upon coming, the birds of the sky) – K Θ f^{13} 565 1010 1241 1424 it^{b,ff^{1},h} vg^{mss} syr^{c,h} cop^{sa,bo^{(mss)},mae} Origen

Matthew 13:6

βαθος ριζης (depth of root) – Θ f^{13}
ριζαν (root) – rell

Matthew 13:6

εξηρανθησαν (they were parched) – D syr^{h}
εξηρανθη (it was parched) – rell

Matthew 13:9

ο εχων ωτα ακουετω (The one having ears must listen) – א* B L it^{a,e,ff^{1},k} syr^{s} Tertullian
ο εχων ωτα ακουειν ακουετω (The one having ears to hear must listen) – rell

Matthew 13:11

το μυστηριον (the mystery) – it^{a,c,ff^{2},k} syr^{s,c} Irenaeus^{lat} Clement
τα μυστηρια (the mysteries) – rell

Matthew 13:13

ινα βλεποντες μη βλεπωσιν και ακουοντες μη ακουωσιν και μη συνιωσιν μηποτε επιστρεψωσιν (so that while seeing they may not be seeing, and while hearing they may not be hearing, and they may not be understanding, lest they would turn back) – D Θ f^{1} f^{13} 22 it^{mss} syr^{s,c} Arab^{ms}
ινα βλεποντες μη βλεπωσιν και ακουοντες μη ακουωσιν μηποτε επιστρεψωσιν και ιασομαι αυτους (so that while seeing they may not be seeing, and while hearing they may not be hearing, lest they would turn back and I would be healing them) – it^{h} Eusebius
ινα βλεποντες μη βλεπωσιν και ακουοντες μη ακουσωσιν μηδε συνωσιν (so that while seeing they may not be seeing, and while hearing they may not be hearing, nor would they be understanding) – 1424 it^{ff^{1}} cop^{sa,mae}
et aures eorum obstrue, et oculos corum grava, ne quando convertantur (and ) – it^{b,c,d,(e),ff^{2*},g^{1},k}
Text omitted – Codex Schøyen
οτι βλεποντες ου βλεπουσιν και ακουοντες ουκ ακουουσιν ουδε συνιουσιν (that while seeing they are not seeing, and while hearing they are not hearing, nor are they understanding) – rell

Matthew 13:14

λεγουσα πορευθητι και ειπε τω λαω τουτω ακοη (saying, "Go and say to this people, Hearing....) – D it cop^{mae} Eusebius
λεγουσα ακοη (saying, "Hearing....) – rell

Matthew 13:17

και ουκ ηδυνηθησαν ιδειν (and they were not able to see) – D
και ουκ ειδαν (and they did not see) – rell

Matthew 13:19

τον λογον εσπαρμενον (the message sown) – syr^{p} cop^{mae}
το σπειρομενον (what is being sown) – D W
το εσπαρμενον (what has been sown) – rell

Matthew 13:21

ουκ εχει δε ριζαν εν (But he does not have root within) – syr^{c}
ουκ εχει δε ριζαν εν αυτω (But it does not have root in him) – L Δ syr^{s,p,h}
ουκ εχει δε ριζαν εν εαυτω (But he does not have root in himself) – rell

Matthew 13:22

η μεριμνα του αιωνος (the concern of the world) – א* B D it^{a,d,e,ff^{2},g^{1},h,k} cop^{sa^{ms}}
η μεριμνα του αιωνος εκεινων (the concern of that world) – it^{c,ff^{1},l} vg^{mss}
η μεριμνα του αιωνος τουτου (the concern of this world) – rell

Matthew 13:23

και καρποφορει (and bears fruit) – vg syr^{c,p} cop^{mae}
τοτε καρποφορει (then bears fruit) – D it^{mss}
και τοτε καρποφορει (and then bears fruit) – it^{k*} syr^{s}
ος δη καρποφορει (who indeed bears fruit) – rell

Matthew 13:28

δουλοι (servants) – omitted by B 157 1424 it^{g^{2},h} cop Eusebius

Matthew 13:31

ελαλησεν (he spoke) – D L* N O Σ Θ ƒ^{13} 1 517 1424 1582 1675 it^{a,b,c,d,e,f,ff^{2},h,k,q} syr^{(s),(c)}
παρεθηκεν (he propounded) – rell

Matthew 13:32

δενδρον μεγα (a great tree) – syr^{p^{(ms)}} cop^{sa} eth geo^{B}
δενδρον (a tree) – rell

Matthew 13:33

ελαλησεν αυτοις (he spoke to them) – B W 0233 0242^{vid} ƒ^{1} 33 𝔐 lat syr^{p} cop^{bo}
ελαλησεν αυτοις λεγων (he spoke to them, saying) – א L M U X Θ ƒ^{13} 28 157 it^{h,(l),q} vg^{mss} cop^{sa^{ms}} mae
παρεθηκεν αυτοις λεγων (he propounded to them, saying) – C 1241 cop^{sa^{mss}}
omitted by – D it^{d,(k)} syr^{s,c} Codex Schøyen

Matthew 13:35

δια Ησαιου του προφητου (through Isaiah the prophet) – א* Θ ƒ^{1} ƒ^{13} 33 713 vg^{ms} eth^{ms} Pseudo-Clement Porphyrius Eusebius^{mss} Jerome^{mss}
δια Ασαφ του προφητου (through Asaph the prophet) – Jerome^{mss}
δια του προφητου (through the prophet) – rell

Matthew 13:35

απο καταβολης (from the foundation) – א^{1} B ƒ^{1} 22 279* 1192 1210 2586 it^{e,k} syr^{(s),(c)} eth Diatessaron Origen Eusebius Jerome^{pt}
απο καταβολης κοσμου (from the foundation of the world) – א^{*,2} C D E F G K L O W X Δ Θ Π Σ 0233 ƒ^{13} 28 33 157 180 205 565 579 597 700 892 1006 1009 1010 1071 1079 1195 1216 1230 1241 1242 1243 1253 1292 1342 1344 1365 1424 1505 1546 1646 2148 2174 𝔐 Lect lat syr^{(p),h} cop arm geo slav Clement Pseudo-Clement Eusebius Hilary Chrysostom^{lem} Jerome^{pt} Hesychius

Matthew 13:36

ηλθεν εις την οικιαν αυτου (he came into his house) – ƒ^{1} 1424 1675 arm^{mss} Origen
ηλθεν εις την οικιαν ο Ιησους (Jesus came into the house) – C L W Θ 0233 ƒ^{13} 𝔐 it^{f,h,q} syr^{(p),h}
ηλθεν εις την οικιαν (he came into the house) – א B D vg syr^{s,c} cop

Matthew 13:36

φρασον (declare) – א^{c} C D L W 0106 0233 0250 ƒ^{1} ƒ^{13} 𝔐 it Origen
διασαφησον (explain) – א* B Θ 0242 1424 vg

Matthew 13:40

τη συντελεια του αιωνος τουτου (the consummation of this age) – C K L P W X Δ Θ Π 0106 0233 0242 0250 ƒ^{13} 28 33 565 579 700 1009 1010 1071 1079 1195 1216 1230 1241 1242 1253 1344 1365 1546 1646 2148 2174 𝔐 Lect it^{f,h,q} syr^{p,h} cop^{sa^{(ms)},bo,fay} geo Diatessaron Chrysostom
τη συντελεια του αιωνος (the consummation of the age) – א B D Γ ƒ^{1} 22 372 892 1582 2737 lat syr^{s,c} cop^{sa,mae} arm eth Irenaeus^{lat} Origen Hilary Lucifer Cyril

Matthew 13:43

ωτα (ears) – א* B Θ 0242 700 it^{a,b,e,k} vg^{mss} Hilary Augustine
ωτα ακουειν (ears to hear) – א^{c} C D E F G K L N O P W X Δ Π Σ 0106 0233 0250 ƒ^{1} ƒ^{13} 28 33 157 180 205 565 579 597 892 1006 1009 1010 1071 1079 1195 1216 1230 1241 1242 1243 1253 1292 1342 1344 1365 1424 1505 1546 2148 2174 𝔐 Lect lat syr cop arm eth geo slav Diatessaron^{arm} Origen Eusebius Hilary Chromatius Pelagius
Text omitted – 𝑙^{387}

Matthew 13:44

παλιν ομοια εστιν η βασιλεια των ουρανων (Again, the kingdom of heaven is like) – C L W Θ 0106 0233 0250 ƒ^{1} ƒ^{13} 𝔐 it^{f,h,q} syr^{p,h} Origen
ομοια εστιν η βασιλεια των ουρανων (The kingdom of heaven is like) – א B D Θ 0242 892 1241 lat syr^{s,c} cop

Matthew 13:44

εν τω αγρω (in the countryside) – omitted by א

Matthew 13:44

οσα εχει πωλει (what he has, he sells) – 28
και πωλει οσα εχει (and he sells what he has) – B 1216 cop^{bo} Origen
και πωλει παντα οσα εχει (and he sells all that he has) – א D 0242 ƒ^{1} (892) 1009 1079 1546 lat syr^{(s),(c),(p),(pal)} cop^{sa,mae,fay} arm eth^{pt} geo Chrysostom
και παντα οσα εχει πωλει (and all that he has, he sells) – C K L P W X Δ Θ Π 0106 0233 0250 ƒ^{13} 22 33 157 372 565 579 700 1010 1071 1195 1230 1241 1242 1344 1365 1646 2148 2174 2737 𝔐 Lect it^{f,q} syr^{h,pal^{ms}} eth^{pt}

Matthew 13:45

ανθρωπω εμπορω (merchant man) – א^{c} C D L W Θ 0106 0233 0242 0250 ƒ^{1} ƒ^{13} 𝔐
εμπορω (merchant) – א* B Γ 1424

Matthew 13:46

ος ευρων (who, upon finding) – C W 0106 0250 ƒ^{13} 𝔐 syr^{h}
ευρων δε (Then, upon finding) – א B D L Θ 0233 0242 ƒ^{1} 33 892 syr^{p} cop

Matthew 13:51

λεγει αυτοις ο Ιησους συνηκατε (Jesus says to them, "Do you understand") – C L W X Δ Θ 0137 0233 ƒ^{1} ƒ^{13} 22 33 372 892 2737 𝔐 it^{(a),f,h,q} vg^{mss} syr^{(c),(p),h} cop^{bo^{(mss)},(mae)}
συνηκατε (Do you understand) – א B D 1010 lat syr^{s} cop^{sa,bo^{mss}}

Matthew 13:51

Ναι κυριε (Yes sir.) – C L W X Δ 0137 0233 22 33 892 𝔐 it^{b,c,e,f,g^{1},h,q} syr^{p,h} cop
Ναι (Yes.) – א B D Θ ƒ^{1} ƒ^{13} 372 517 1424 1675 2737 lat syr^{s,c}

Matthew 13:54

Αντιπατριδα (Antipatris) – א*
πατριδα (homeland) – rell

Matthew 13:54

και δυναμεις (and abilities) – 579 700
Text omitted – ƒ^{1} (Origen)
και αι δυναμεις (and these abilities) – rell

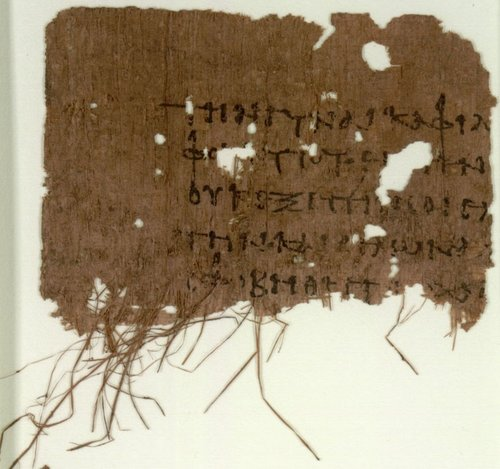
Matthew 13:55-56 from Papyrus 103

Matthew 13:55

Ιακωβος και Ιωση και Σιμων (Jacob and Jose and Simon) – S^{c} 118 157 700* 713 1009 1010 1071 𝑙^{70} cop^{bo^{(mss)}}
Ιακωβος και Ιωσης και Σιμων (Jacob and Joses and Simon) – K L W Δ Π 0106 ƒ^{13} 22 180 205 372 565 597 1079 1195 1216 1230 1241 1242 1253 1342 1365 1546 1582^{mg} 1646 2148 2174 2737 𝔐^{pt} Lect^{pt} it^{k,q^{(c)}} cop^{sa,bo^{(mss)},fay} arm eth^{pt} slav^{mss} Diatessaron Basil
Ιακωβος και Ιωσηφ και Σιμων (Jacob and Joseph and Simon) – א^{c} B C N O Θ Σ ƒ^{1} 13 33 700^{c} 892 l184 l387 l997 lat syr^{s,c,h^{(mg)},pal} cop^{bo^{(mss)},mae} eth^{pt} geo slav^{mss} Origen^{pt} Eusebius Basil Jerome Augustine
Ιακωβος και Ιωαννης και Ιωσης και Σιμων (Jacob and John and Joses and Simon) – 1344 vg^{mss}
Ιακωβος και Ιωαννης και Σιμων (Jacob and John and Simon) – 𝔓^{103}^{vid} א*^{vid} D E G M U X Γ 2 28 579 1424 1505 𝔐^{pt} Lect^{pt} it^{d} vg^{mss} Origen^{pt}

Matthew 13:57

εν τη πατριδι αυτου (in his homeland) – E G K L W Y Π 0106 ƒ^{1} 28 565 𝔐
εν τη ιδια πατριδι (in their own homeland) – א Z ƒ^{13} 892 Origen^{pt}
εν τη ιδια πατριδι αυτου (in his own homeland) – C
εν τη πατριδι (in the homeland) – B D Θ 0281 33 700 1424 it^{a,k} Origen^{pt}

15 Textual variants in Matthew 14

Matthew 14:3

Ηρωδης κρατησας (Herod apprehended) – א C D K L W X Δ Π ƒ^{1} 28 33 565 892 1009 1071 1079 1195 1216 1230 1241 1242 1253 1344 1365 1546 1646 2148 2174 𝔐 Lect lat syr cop^{bo,fay} arm eth geo^{mss} Diatessaron
Ηρωδης τοτε κρατησας (Herod at that time apprehended) – B Θ ƒ^{13} 160 569 700 1010 1293 1295 1306 1310 1604 2831 it^{k} cop^{sa,mae-1} geo^{mss} Arab^{ms}

Matthew 14:3

εδησεν αυτον (bound him) – א^{2} C D E G K L W Y Z Θ Π 0106 ƒ^{1} ƒ^{13} 33 372 565 892 2737 𝔐 lat syr cop
εδησεν (bound) – א* B 700 𝑙^{2211} it^{ff^{1},h,q} cop^{bo^{(mss)}} geo^{ms}

Matthew 14:3

εν τη φυλακη (into prison) – D it^{a,e,k}
εν τη φυλακη και απεθετο (into prison and put away) – א^{2}
και εθετο εν φυλακη (and put in prison) – C L W 0106* 𝔐 syr^{h}
και απεθετο εν τη φυλακη (and put away into prison) – ƒ^{1} 700
και εν τη φυλακη απεθετο (and put away into prison) – B^{2} Θ 892
και εν φυλακη απεθετο (and put away in prison) – א* B* ƒ^{13} 33 1424 it^{ff^{1},h}

Matthew 14:3

Φιλιππου (of Philip) – omitted by D 372 2737 it^{a,c,d,e,ff^{1},g^{1},k,l} vg^{mss} Diatessaron^{arm} Jerome Augustine

Matthew 14:6

γενεσιων αγομενων (birthday celebration being conducted) – W 0106 0136 ƒ^{13} 𝔐
γενεσιων γενομενων (birthday celebration was happening) – C K N Θ 565 892 1241 1424
γενεσιοις γενομενοις (birthday celebrations were happening) – א B D L Z ƒ^{(1)} 1010

Matthew 14:12

σωμα (body) – W X Γ Δ Π Φ 0106 0136 28 𝔐 lat syr^{h} cop^{sa,bo^{(mss)},mae}
πτωμα (corpse) – א B C D L Θ ƒ^{1} ƒ^{13} 33 565 700 892 1010 1241 1424 it^{e,k} syr^{s,c,p} cop^{bo^{mss}}

Matthew 14:14

ειδεν (he saw) – it^{a,b,ff^{2}} syr^{s,c}
εξελθων ο Ιησους ειδεν (Jesus saw coming forth) – C (L) W 067 0106^{vid} 𝔐 it^{f,h,q} syr^{p,h}
εξελθων ειδεν (he saw coming forth) – א B D Θ ƒ^{1} ƒ^{13} 33 700 892* vg cop

Matthew 14:16

Ιησους (Jesus) – omitted by א* D Z^{vid} 1424 it^{e,k} syr^{s,c,p} cop^{sa,bo}

Matthew 14:22

ευθεως (immediately) – omitted by א* C* 892* it^{(ms)} syr^{s,c} Diatessaron Chrysostom

Matthew 14:24

σταδιους πολλους απο της γης απειχεν (was being constrained many stadia away from the land) – B cop^{(sa),mae-2} Diatessaron
σταδιους πολλους απο απειχεν (was being constrained many stadia away) – ƒ^{13}
απειχεν απο της γης σταδιους ικανους (was being constrained a considerable number of stadia away from the land) – Θ (700) syr^{c,p,pal} arm
απειχεν απο της γης σταδιους ως εικοσι πεντε (was being constrained about twenty-five stadia away from the land) – cop^{bo,mae-1} eth^{pt}
εκινδυνευεν ηδη μεσον της θαλασσης (was being endangered then at mid-sea) – 1546
ην εις μεσον της θαλασσης (was into the midst of the sea) – D (1424) it^{d,e,ff^{1}} (Eusebius)
μεσον της θαλασσης ην (was mid-sea) – א C E F G (K) L P W X Y Δ Π Σ 073 084 0106 ƒ^{1} 28 33 157 180 205 565 579 597 892 1006 1009 1010 1071 1079 1195 1216 1230 1241 1242 1243 1253 1292 1342 1344 1365 1505 1646 2148 2174 𝔐 Lect lat syr^{h} slav eth^{pt} Origen Chrysostom^{lem} Chromatius Jerome Augustine

Matthew 14:26

και ιδοντες αυτον οι μαθηται (And upon seeing him, the disciples) – C E F G K L W Y Π 0106 28 33 565 892 𝔐 syr^{h} cop^{bo^{pt}}
και ιδοντες αυτον (And upon seeing him) – 073 084 ƒ^{1} 1241 1424 it^{c,l} vg cop^{bo^{pt}}
οι δε μαθηται ιδοντες αυτον (But the disciples, upon seeing him) – א^{1} B D ƒ^{13} cop^{mae}
ιδοντες δε αυτον (But upon seeing him) – א* Θ 700 it^{a,b,e,ff^{1},ff^{2},g^{1},h,q} cop^{sa}

Matthew 14:27

ο Ιησους (Jesus) – omitted by א* D 084 892 1010 it^{d,ff^{1}} syr^{c} cop^{sa,bo} Eusebius

Matthew 14:30

ανεμον ισχυρον σφοδρα (exceedingly strong wind) – W cop^{(mae)}
ανεμον ισχυρον (strong wind) – B^{2} C D E F G K L P W X (Y) Δ Θ Π Σ 0106 ƒ^{1} ƒ^{13} 28 157 180 205 565 579 597 700 892 1006 1009 1010 1071 1079 1195 1216 1230 1241 1242 1243 1253 1292 1342 1344 1365 1424 1505 1546 1646 2148 2174 𝔐 Lect lat syr cop^{(mae)} arm eth geo slav Origen Basil Gaudentius Chrysostom Chromatius Jerome Augustine
ανεμον (wind) – א B* 073 33 vg^{ms} cop^{sa,bo,mae-2}

Matthew 14:32

εμβαντι αυτω (when he was embarking) – 1241 it syr^{c} cop^{sa^{ms},bo,mae}
εμβαντων αυτων (as they were embarking) – C L W 0106 ƒ^{1} 𝔐
αναβαντων αυτων (as they were climbing up) – א B D Θ 084 ƒ^{13} 33 700 892 1424

Matthew 14:33

εν τω πλοιω προσελθοντες (they were drawing near unto the boat) – Θ ƒ^{13} 1424 syr^{s,c}
εν τω πλοιω ελθοντες (they were coming into the boat) – D L P W X Δ 0106 33 372 2737 𝔐 lat syr^{p,h} cop^{mae-1}
εν τω πλοιω οντες (while being in the boat) – 28 118 209 cop^{sa}
εν τω πλοιω (in the boat) – א B C N ƒ^{1} 22 579 700 892* 1010 it^{ff^{1}} cop^{bo}

18 Textual variants in Matthew 15

Matthew 15:4

ο γαρ θεος ενετειλατο λεγων (For God commanded, saying) — א^{*,2} C E F G K L N W X Y Δ Π Σ 0106 13 22 33 157 180 205 565 597 828 1006 1009 1010 1071 1079 1195 1216 1230 1241 1242 1243 1253 1292 1342 1344 1365 1424 1505 1546 1646 2148 2174 𝔐 Lect it^{f} syr^{h} slav (Chrysostom)
ο γαρ θεος ειπεν (For God said) — א^{1} B D Θ 073 084 ƒ^{1} 124 579 700 788 892 Lat syr^{s,c,p} cop arm eth geo Diatessaron Ptolemy Irenaeus^{lat} Origen Ambrosiaster Amphilochius Chromatius Jerome Augustine Cyril

Matthew 15:6

τον πατερα η την μητερα αυτου (father or his mother) — Θ ƒ^{1} 205 (1216) 1424 𝑙^{184} 𝑙^{1152} geo^{mss} slav Diatessaron^{(arm)} Origen^{pt} Ambrosiaster
τον πατερα αυτου η την μητερα (his father or mother) — 073 084 ƒ^{13} 33 579 700 892 1071 1505 𝑙^{(1761)} it^{ff^{2},g^{1},l} vg^{mss} Chrysostom Jerome Cyril^{pt}
τον πατερα αυτου η την μητερα αυτου (his father or his mother) — C E F G K L N W X Δ Π Σ 0106 0233 157 180 372 597 1006 1009 1010 1079 1195 1230 1242 1243 1253 1292 1342 1344 1365 (1546) 1646 2148 2174 2737 𝔐 Lect it^{aur,f,ff^{1}} vg^{mss} syr^{p,h} (arm) eth Diatessaron^{syr} Origen^{pt} Chromatius Cyril^{pt}
τον πατερα αυτου και την μητερα αυτου (his father and his mother) — Φ 565 1241 it^{(b),c,q} syr^{s} cop^{bo,mae-1} geo^{mss}
τον πατερα αυτου (his father) — א B D Ω it^{a,d,e} syr^{c} cop^{sa} geo^{mss} Origen^{lat} Augustine
Text omitted — Codex Schøyen

Matthew 15:6

την εντολην (the commandment) — E F G K L N W X Y (Δ) Π Σ Φ 0106 0233 ƒ^{1} 22 33 157 180 205 372 565 597 1006 1009 1071 1079 1195 1216 1241 1242 1243 1253 1292 1342 1344 1365 1424 1505 1546 1582 1646 2148 2174 2737 2786 𝔐 Lect it^{aur,c,f,g^{1},l,q} vg syr^{h} cop^{mae-2} geo^{mss} Origen^{pt} Didymus^{vid} Chrysostom Cyril
τον νομον (the law) — א^{*,2} C 073 084 ƒ^{13} 21 160 1010 1097* 1293 2766 geo^{mss} slav Ptolemy Epiphanius
τον λογον (the word) — א^{1} B D Θ 579 700 892 1230 1582^{mg} it^{a,b,d,e,ff^{1},(ff^{2})} syr^{s,c,p,h^{(mg)}} cop^{sa,bo,mae-1} arm eth geo^{mss} Diatessaron Irenaeus^{lat} Origen^{pt} Eusebius Chromatius Augustine

Matthew 15:8

εγγιζει μοι ο λαος ουτος τω στοματι αυτων και (This people is approaching me with their mouth, and) — C W X Δ 0106 ƒ^{13^{pt}} 𝔐 it^{f,q} syr^{h} Arab^{ms}
ο λαος ουτος εγγιζει μοι (This people is approaching me) — ƒ^{1}
ο λαος ουτος (This people) — א B D L Θ 073 084 ƒ^{13^{pt}} 33 124 372 579 700 788 892 1424 2737 lat syr^{s,c,p} cop Egerton Gospel Clement Origen Didymus

Matthew 15:11

κοινοι τον ανθρωπον (defiles the man) — 22 1241 it^{a,aur,e,ff^{1}} cop^{sa}
εκεινο κοινωνει τον ανθρωπον (that vulgarizes the man) — D
Text omitted — ƒ^{1} 124 1071 cop^{bo^{mss}} Origen
τουτο κοινοι τον ανθρωπον (this defiles the man) — rell

Matthew 15:14

τυφλοι εισιν (they are blind) — Codex Schøyen
τυφλοι εισιν οδηγοι (they are blind guides) — B D 0237 it^{d}
οδηγοι εισιν τυφλοι (they are blind guides) — א^{*,2} 𝑙^{(12)} cop^{sa,bo^{mss},fay^{vid}} Epiphanius
οδηγοι εισιν τυφλων (they are guides of the blind) — K syr^{s,c} eth^{ms}
οδηγοι εισιν τυφλοι τυφλων (they are blind guides of the blind) — C E F G N O W X Y Δ Π Σ 0106^{vid} 157 180 565 597 1006 1009 1010 1071 1079 1195 1230 1242 1243 1253 1292 1342 1344 1365 1505 1546 1646 (2148) 2174 𝔐 Lect it^{q} cop^{bo^{mss}} slav Chrysostom
τυφλοι εισιν οδηγοι τυφλων (they are blind guides of the blind) — א^{1} L Z Θ 0233 ƒ^{1} ƒ^{13} 22 33 205 372 579 700 892 1216 1241 1424 2737 lat syr^{p,h} cop^{bo^{mss},mae-1} arm eth^{mss} geo Origen Cyprian Basil Chromatius Jerome Augustine Cyril Theodoret

Matthew 15:14

τυφλος δε τυφλον οδηγων σφαλησεται και (But blind leading the blind will fall, and) — Θ ƒ^{13} cop^{mae}
τυφλος δε τυφλον εαν οδηγη (But if blind lead the blind) — rell

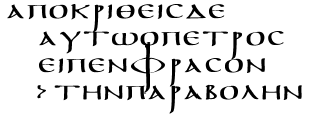
Matthew 15:15 in codex 0237; it may include the variant την παραβολην

Matthew 15:15

την παραβολην ταυτην (this parable) — C D E F G K L O W X Y (Δ) Θ Π Σ 0106 0119 0233 0281 22 33 157 180 205 372 565 597 1006 1009 1010 1071 1079 1195 1216 1230 1241 1242 1243 1253 1292 1342 1344 1365 1424 1505 1546 1646 2148 2174 2737 𝔐 Lect lat syr cop^{sa^{ms},mae-1} arm eth geo^{mss} slav Basil Chrysostom Jerome Augustine
ταυτην την παραβολην (this parable) — ƒ^{13}
την παραβολην (the parable) — א B Z^{vid} 0237^{vid} ƒ^{1} 579 700 892 vg^{mss} cop^{sa^{mss},bo} geo^{mss} Origen Chromatius Cyril

Matthew 15:16

Ιησους (Jesus) — omitted by א B D Z 33 892 1424 lat syr^{s,c,p} cop

Matthew 15:17

ουπω νοειτε (Do you not yet understand) — א C L W 0106 ƒ^{1} ƒ^{13^{pt}} 700 𝔐 it^{f,q} syr^{h} cop^{bo}
ου νοειτε (Do you not understand) — B D Z Θ ƒ^{13^{pt}} 33 565 lat syr^{s,c,p} cop^{sa,mae-1} Origen

Matthew 15:22

δεινως (terribly) — 1 1582 Origen
sævissime (furiously) — it^{a}
κακως (badly) — rell

Matthew 15:26

ουκ εξεστιν (It is not lawful) — D it^{a,b,c,d,ff^{1},ff^{2},g^{1},r^{1}} syr^{s,c} (Diatessaron) Ps-Clement Origen Ambrosiaster Hilary Basil Ambrose Jerome
ουκ εστιν (It is not) — 1293 Tertullian Eusebius
ουκ καλον εστιν (It is not right) — 544 1010 1365 𝑙^{309} geo
ουκ εστιν καλον (It is not right) — א B C K L W X Δ Θ Π ƒ^{1} ƒ^{13} 33 565 700 892 1009 1071 1079 1195 1216 1230 1241 1242 1253 1344 1546 1646 2148 2174 𝔐 Lect it^{aur,e,f,k,l,q} vg syr^{p,h} cop arm eth Origen Chrysostom

Matthew 15:30

κωφους (deaf-mute) — omitted by D

Matthew 15:30

του Ιησου (of Jesus) — C K P W Γ Δ ƒ^{1} 565 1010 1241 𝔐 it^{f,q} syr^{p,h}
αυτου (of him) — rell

Matthew 15:31

τον οχλον (the crowd) — א C D O U Δ Θ Π ƒ^{1} ƒ^{13} 33 579 700 892 1010 1241 1424
τους οχλους (the crowds) — B E F G K L W Y Π 565 𝔐 lat syr cop^{mae}

Matthew 15:31

κωφους λαλουντας και χωλους περιπατουντας και τυφλους βλεποντας (deaf-mute are speaking and lame are walking and blind are seeing) — א ƒ^{1} 22 700* 892 1241 𝑙^{184} lat syr^{s,c} eth^{mss} Origen Jerome Augustine
κωφους λαλουντας και χωλους περιπατουντας και τυφλους βλεποντας και κυλλους υγιεις (deaf-mute are speaking and lame are walking and blind are seeing and crippled are healed) — 579
κωφους λαλουντας χωλους περιπατουντας τυφλους βλεποντας δυσκωφους ακουοντας (mute are speaking, lame are walking, blind are seeing, deaf are hearing) — cop^{bo^{mss}} (geo)
κωφους λαλουντας και τυφλους βλεποντας και χωλους περιπατουντας (deaf-mute are speaking and blind are seeing and lame are walking) — 700*
κωφους λαλουντας και τυφλους βλεποντας και κυλλους υγιεις και χωλους περιπατουντας (deaf-mute are speaking and blind are seeing and crippled are healed and lame are walking) — 700^{c}
κωφους λαλουντας κυλλους υγιεις και χωλους περιπατουντας και τυφλους βλεποντας (deaf-mute are speaking, crippled are healed and lame are walking and blind are seeing) — C E F G H K L P W X Δ Π 0233 180 205 565 597 700^{(c)} 1006 1009 1010 1079 1195 1242 1292 1342 1344 1365 1505 1546 1646 2148 2174 𝔐 Lect^{pt} it^{(d),(f),(q)} cop^{mae} slav Chrysostom
κωφους λαλουντας και κυλλους υγιεις και χωλους περιπατουντας και τυφλους βλεποντας (deaf-mute are speaking and crippled are healed and lame are walking and blind are seeing) — D Θ ƒ^{13} 33 157 1230 1253 1424 𝑙^{76} syr^{p,h}
κωφους λαλουντας χωλους περιπατουντας κυλλους υγιεις τυφλους βλεποντας (deaf-mute are speaking, lame are walking, crippled are healed, blind are seeing) — arm
κωφους ακουοντας και χωλους περιπατουντας και τυφλους βλεποντας (deaf-mute are hearing and lame are walking and blind are seeing) — it^{e} eth^{mss}
κωφους ακουοντας κυλλους υγιεις και χωλους περιπατουντας και τυφλους βλεποντας (deaf-mute are hearing, crippled are healed and lame are walking and blind are seeing) — B Φ 1243 𝑙^{(211)} syr^{h^{mg}}
κωφους ακουοντας και λαλουντας κυλλους υγιεις και χωλους περιπατουντας και τυφλους βλεποντας (deaf-mute are hearing and speaking, crippled are healed and lame are walking and blind are seeing) — N O Σ
κωφους ακουοντας αλαλους λαλουντας κυλλους υγιεις και χωλους περιπατουντας και τυφλους βλεποντας (deaf-mute are hearing, speechless are speaking, crippled are healed and lame are walking and blind are seeing) — Lect^{pt}
αλαλους λαλουντας κωφους ακουοντας κυλλους υγιεις και χωλους περιπατουντας και τυφλους βλεποντας (speechless are speaking, deaf-mute are hearing, crippled are healed and lame are walking and blind are seeing) — 1071
χωλους περιπατουντας και κωφους λαλουντας τυφλους βλεποντας και κυλλους υγιεις (lame are walking and deaf-mute are speaking, blind are seeing and crippled are healed) — 1216 cop^{sa^{mss}}
χωλους περιπατουντας κυλλους υγιεις κωφους λαλουντας τυφλους βλεποντας (lame are walking, crippled are healed, deaf-mute are speaking, blind are seeing) — cop^{sa^{mss}}

Matthew 15:35

παραγγειλας τω οχλω (directing the crowd) — א B D Θ ƒ^{1} ƒ^{13} 33 892*
εκελευσεν τοις οχλοις (commanding the crowds) — L W 700 892^{c} 𝔐 syr
εκελευσεν τους οχλους (commanding the crowds) — C 1010 1424

Matthew 15:39

Μαγαδαν (Magadan) — א* B D it^{d}
Μαγεδαν (Magedan) — א^{c} Δ^{lat} it^{aur,c,f,ff^{1},g^{1}} vg syr^{s} cop^{(sa)} eth Eusebius Jerome Augustine
Μαγεδαμ (Magedam) — it^{a,b,e,ff^{2},l}
Μαγαδον (Magadon) — syr^{c}
Μαγαδιν (Magadin) — syr^{pal}
Μαγδυ (Magdu) — syr^{p}
Μαγεδαλ (Magedal) — eth^{mss}
Μαγδαλαν (Magdalan) — C M N O W Σ* 33 205 565 579 1079 1195 1546 𝑙^{5} 𝑙^{292} 𝑙^{514} 𝑙^{672} 𝑙^{(1074)} it^{q} cop^{mae-1,bo}
Μαγδαλα (Magdala) — E F G H K L X Δ^{gr} Θ Π Σ^{c} ƒ^{1} ƒ^{13} 22 157 180 372 597 700 892 1006 1009 1010 1071 1216 1230 1241 1242 1243 1253 1292 1342 1344 1365 1424 1505 1646 2174 2737 𝔐 Lect syr^{h} arm geo slav arab^{ms} Chrysostom

24 Textual variants in Matthew 16

Matthew 16:1

ηρωτησαν (they inquired) — א^{1} 892
ηρωτων (they were inquiring) — א^{2}
επηρωτων (they were questioning) — א* Θ ƒ^{1} ƒ^{13} 565 1241 1424
επηρωτησαν (they questioned) — rell

Matthew 16:2-3

οψιας γενομενης λεγετε ευδια πυρραζει γαρ ο ουρανος και πρωι σημερον χειμων πυρραζει γαρ στυγναζων ο ουρανος {Insert: υποκριται (Hypocrites!) in E H S Π Σ 372 565 700 2737 𝔐 it syr^{p} cop^{bo^{mss}} Diatessaron^{arab}} το μεν προσωπον του ουρανου γινωσκετε διακρινειν τα δε σημεια των καιρων ου δυνασθε (Come evening, you^{pl} say, 'Good weather' because the sky reddens, then at dawn, 'A storm today' because the sky reddens, becoming gloomy. Indeed, you^{pl} know to discern the appearance of the sky, but not able (to discern) the signs of the times) — C (D) F G H (K) L (N) O (W) Δ Θ ƒ^{1} 22 33 180 205 262 (579) 597 892 1006 1009 1010 1071 1079 1195 1230 1241 1242 1243 1253 1292 1342 1344 1365 1424 1505 1546 1646 2148 2174 Lect it^{d} vg syr^{h} eth geo slav Theophilus Juvencus Eusebius Hilary Apostolic Constitutions Chrysostom Jerome Augustine Euthalius
Text omitted — א B V X Y Γ 031 033 034 036 047 2* ƒ^{13} 34 39 44 84 151 157 180 194 272 274 344 376 445 539 563 595 661 699 776 777 780 788 792 826 828 852 1073 1074 1076 1078 1080 1216 1424^{mg} 2542 syr^{s,c} cop^{sa,bo^{mss},mae} arm Origen Jerome^{mss}

Matthew 16:4

και μοιχαλις (and adulterous) — omitted by D it

Matthew 16:4

σημειον αιτει και (asks for a sign, and) — B*
σημειον ζητει και (seeks a sign, and) — D Θ
text omitted — 700
σημειον επιζητει και (seeks after a sign, and) — B^{c} rell

Matthew 16:4

Ἰωνα του προφητου (of the prophet Jonah) — C W X Δ Θ ƒ^{1} ƒ^{13} 22 33 372 892 2737 𝔐 it^{a,b,c,e,f,ff^{2},q} vg^{mss} syr cop^{bo,mae}
Ἰωνα (of Jonah) — א B D L 579 700 it^{aur,d,ff^{1},g^{1},l} vg^{mss} cop^{sa} Justin

Matthew 16:5

οι μαθηται αυτου (his disciples) — K L W X Π ƒ^{1} 33 565 1009 1010 1071 1079 1195 1216 1230 1241 1242 1253 1344 1365 1546 1646 2148 2174 𝔐 Lect it^{(a),aur,(b),(c),f,ff^{(1)},ff^{(2)},g^{(1)},l,q} vg syr cop eth geo Diatessaron (Origen)
οι μαθηται (the disciples) — א B C (D) Θ ƒ^{13} (700) 892 𝑙^{184} it^{(d),(e)} cop^{sa^{(ms)}} arm
text omitted — Δ

Matthew 16:8

ελαβετε (you^{pl} took) — C E F G K L W X Y Δ Π ƒ^{1} 22 33 565 1009 1010 1071 1079 1195 1216 1230 1242 1253 1344 1424 1546 1646 2148 2174 𝔐 Lect it^{f} syr cop^{sa} Origen Eusebius Chrysostom
εχετε (you^{pl} have) — א B D Θ ƒ^{13} 372 579 700 892 1241 2737 lat cop^{bo,mae} arm geo^{mss} Diatessaron Lucifer
ελαβομεν (we took) — 1365 𝑙^{1579} geo^{mss}

Matthew 16:11

αρτου (a loaf of bread) — D W Γ Δ 𝔐^{pt} vg syr^{p,h} cop^{bo^{mss}}
αρτων (loaves of bread) — rell

Matthew 16:12

των αρτων (of the bread) — ƒ^{1} 517 1424 1478* 1675 it^{e} Origen
της ζυμης (of the leaven) — D Θ ƒ^{13} 124* 173 565 788 803 1058 1331 2145^{c} 2295 2315 it^{a,b,d,ff^{2}} syr^{s} cop^{mae-2} arm geo^{mss} Lucifer
της ζυμης των αρτων (of the leaven of the breads) — א^{2} B K* L 157 176 372 375^{(c)} 805 892 954 1009 1241 1273^{c} 1295^{c} 1446 1478^{c} 1500^{c} 2585 2605 2737 Lect^{pt} it^{aur,g^{1},l} vg cop (Ambrose) Jerome
της ζυμης του αρτου (of the leaven of the bread) — C E F G H K^{c} O W X Y Γ Δ Π Σ 13 22 28 124^{c} 180 205 387^{c} 597 700 828 1006 1010 1071 1079 1195 1230 1242 1243 1253 1292 1344 1365 1500* 1505 1546 1646 2145* 2148 2174 𝔐 Lect it^{c,f,q} syr^{p,h} cop^{sa^{ms},bo^{mss}} eth geo^{mss} slav Diatessaron^{pt} Gaudentius Chrysostom
της ζυμης των Φαρισαιων (of the leaven of the Pharisees) — 33 1295*
της ζυμης των Φαρισαιων και Σαδδουκαιων (of the leaven of the Pharisees and Sadduccees) — א^{*} 30 387* (579) 722 785 1093 (1240) 1279 1402 2297 2714 it^{ff^{1}} syr^{c} Diatessaron^{pt}

Matthew 16:13

τινα λεγουσιν οι ανθρωποι ειναι τον υιον του ανθρωπου (Who are the people claiming the Son of Man to be?) — B 𝑙^{1353} it^{c} vg^{mss} syr^{pal} cop eth Origen Jerome Cyril^{pt}
τινα λεγουσιν ειναι οι ανθρωποι τον υιον του ανθρωπου (Who are the people claiming the Son of Man to be??) — 1582*
τινα λεγουσιν με οι ανθρωποι ειναι τον υιον του ανθρωπου (What are the people claiming me to be? The Son of Man?) — C W syr arm geo slav Diatessaron^{(arm)}
τινα με λεγουσιν οι ανθρωποι ειναι τον υιον του ανθρωπου (What are the people claiming me to be? The Son of Man?) — E F G H K L X Δ Θ Π Σ ƒ^{13} 28 33 118 157 180 205 565 597 892 1006 1009 1010 1071 1079 1195 1216 1230 1241 1242 1243 1253 1292 1342 1344 1365 1424 1505 1546 1646 2148 2174 𝔐 Lect it^{aur,d,f,ff^{2},g^{1},l} vg^{(mss)} Irenaeus^{(lat)} (Tertullian) Origen Adamantius^{vid} (Hilary) (Ephraem) (Ambrose) Epiphanius Chrysostom Severian Marcus Eremita (Augustine) Cyril^{pt} Theodotus-Ancyra John-Damascus
τινα με λεγουσιν ειναι οι ανθρωποι τον υιον του ανθρωπου (Who are the people claiming me, the Son of Man, to be?) — ƒ^{1} 1 1582^{c} it^{ff^{1}}
τινα με οι ανθρωποι λεγουσιν ειναι τον υιον του ανθρωπου (What are the people claiming me to be? The Son of Man?) — D it^{a,b,e,q,r^{1}}
τινα οι ανθρωποι με λεγουσιν ειναι τον υιον του ανθρωπου (Who are the people claiming me, the Son of Man, to be?) — א^{2} 579 700 Cyril^{pt}
τινα οι ανθρωποι με ειναι λεγουσιν τον υιον του ανθρωπου (What are the people claiming me to be? The Son of Man?) — א*
τις λεγει ο οχλος περι του υιον του ανθρωπου εστιν ουτος (Regarding the Son of Man, who is the crowd saying this is?) — Codex Schøyen

Matthew 16:19

κλειδας (keys) — א* B* L W
κλεις (key) — א^{2} B^{c} C D ƒ^{1} ƒ^{13} 𝔐

Matthew 16:20

διεστειλατο (commanded) — א B^{c} C L W Θ ƒ^{1} ƒ^{13} 𝔐 lat syr^{p,h} cop Origen^{mss}
επετιμησεν (rebuked) — B* D it^{(d),e} syr^{c} arm arab^{ms} Origen^{mss}

Matthew 16:20

μαθηταις αυτου (his disciples) — L W Θ ƒ^{1} ƒ^{13} 𝔐 lat syr cop
μαθηταις (the disciples) — א B C D 700 cop^{sa^{mss}}

Matthew 16:20

ο Χριστος Ιησους (the Christ Jesus) — D it^{c}
Ιησους ο Χριστος (Jesus the Christ) — א^{2} C E F G H K W X Σ 13 22 157 205 372 579 828 892 1006 1071 1241 1243 1292 2737 𝔐 Lect it^{d,f,l,q,r^{1}} vg syr^{h} cop^{sa^{ms},bo,mae} eth geo^{mss} slav^{mss} Jerome Augustine
ο Χριστος (the Christ) — א* B L Δ Θ Π ƒ^{1} 28 124 174 180 565 598 700 788 1010 1342 1424 1505 1675 𝑙^{68} 𝑙^{673} 𝑙^{813} 𝑙^{1223} it^{a,aur,b,e,ff^{1},ff^{2},g^{1}} vg^{mss} syr^{c,p} cop^{sa^{mss}} arm geo^{mss} slav^{mss} Diatessaron Origen Hilary Ambrose Chrysostom

Matthew 16:21

ο Ιησους Χριστος (Jesus Christ) — 1279
Ιησους Χριστος (Jesus Christ) — א* B* cop^{sa^{mss},bo,mae-1}
ο Ιησους (Jesus) — א^{2} C K L W X Δ Θ Π ƒ^{1} ƒ^{13} 28 372 565 700 1009 1010 1071 1079 1195 1216 1230 1241 1242 1253 1344 1365 1546 1646 2148 2174 2737 𝔐 Lect latt syr cop^{sa^{ms},bo} arm eth geo^{mss} Origen Basil Augustine
Ιησους (Jesus) — B^{c} D
omit text — א^{1} 579 892 1604 cop^{mae-2} geo^{mss} arab^{ms} Irenaeus^{lat} Chrysostom

Matthew 16:21

γραμματεων του λαου (scribes of the people) — Θ Φ ƒ^{1} ƒ^{13} 1424 1675 arm geo^{mss} cop^{mae-1} Origen^{lat}
γραμματεων (scribes) — rell

Matthew 16:21

μετα τρεις ημερας (after three days) — D it cop^{bo}
τη τριτη ημερα (on the third day) — rell

Matthew 16:21

αναστηναι (to rise/stand up) — D 157 cop^{bo}
εγερθηναι (to be raised) — rell

Matthew 16:22

λεγει επιτιμων αυτω (admonishing, saying to him) — B 346
ηρξατο επιτιμαν αυτω λεγων (began admonishing, saying to him) — א C K L W Γ Δ 579 892 1241 𝔐 syr^{(p),h}
ηρξατο αυτω επιτιμαν λεγων (began admonishing to him, saying) — ƒ^{1} ƒ^{13} 700 1424
ηρξατο αυτω επιτιμαν αυτω λεγων (began admonishing to him, saying to him) — 565
ηρξατο αυτον επιτιμαν λεγων (began admonishing him, saying) — Θ
ηρξατο αυτω επιτιμαν και λεγειν (began admonishing to him and saying) — D (it)

Matthew 16:23

αλλα του ανθρωπου (but of man) — D it^{d,ff^{(1)},q}
text omitted — it^{e,ff^{2},g^{1},r^{1}}
αλλα τα των ανθρωπων (but the things of men) — rell

Matthew 16:24

Ιησους (Jesus) — B*
text omitted — 565 cop^{sa^{ms}}
ο Ιησους (Jesus) — rell

Matthew 16:26

ωφελειται (is profited) — C D K W Γ Δ 565 1241 1424 𝔐 lat syr^{h} Justin Clement
ωφεληθησεται (will be profited) — א B L Θ ƒ^{1} ƒ^{13} 33 579 700 892 it^{e,f,q} cop Origen Cyril

Matthew 16:27

την πραξιν αυτου (their doing) — א^{2} B C D E G H L W Δ Θ Σ ƒ^{13} 33 157 180 205 565 579 700 892 1006 1010 1071 1241 1243 1292 1342 𝔐 Lect it^{aur,e,l} vg^{mss} Origen^{pt} Apollinaris Didymus Chrysostom^{pt} Jerome^{pt}
τα εργα αυτου (their deeds) — א* F ƒ^{1} 28 597 1424 it^{a,b,c,d,f,ff^{1},ff^{2},g^{1},q} vg^{mss} syr cop eth geo slav Hippolytus^{vid} Origen^{lat} Chrysostom^{pt} Jerome^{pt}
την ταξιν αυτου (their arrangement) — 1505 𝑙^{184}
την αξιαν αυτου (their merit) — 𝑙^{387}

Matthew 16:28

δοξη του Πατρος (glory of the Father) — א^{c} 892 eth cop^{bo}
βασιλεια (kingdom) — rell

30 Textual variants in Matthew 17

Matthew 17:1

levavit (he took them up) — it^{d}
inposuit (he positioned them) — it^{e}
ducit (he leads them) — lat
αναγει αυτους (he leads them up) — D 1 1582 cop^{bo^{ms},mae-2} Origen
αναφερει αυτους (he brings them) — rell

Matthew 17:1

λιαν (very) — D it^{d} Eusebius
κατ’ ιδιαν (privately) — rell

Matthew 17:2

χιων (snow) — D lat syr^{c} cop^{bo^{mss}} eth^{mss} geo^{mss} slav^{ms} Hilary Epiphanius Chromatius Jerome Cyril^{pt}
το φως (the light) — א B C E F G H L O W Δ Θ Σ ƒ^{1} ƒ^{13} 28 33 157 180 205 565 579 597 700 892 1006 1010 1071 1241 1243 1292 1342 1424 1505 𝔐 Lect it^{q} syr^{p,h,pal} cop^{sa,bo^{mss},mae} arm eth geo^{mss} slav^{mss} Origen Eusebius Asterius Chrysostom Cyril^{pt} Hesychius Theodoret

Matthew 17:3

ωφθη (he was seen) — 𝔓^{44}^{vid} א B D Θ ƒ^{13} 33 579 it^{mss} vg^{mss} syr^{c} Tertullian
ωφθησαν (they were seen) — C K L W Γ Δ ƒ^{1} 565 700 892 1241 1424 𝔐 Lect it^{f,ff^{1},q} vg^{mss} syr^{p,h} Cyril

Matthew 17:4

ποιήσω (I will make) — it^{ff^{1}} Chromatius^{pt}
ποιησω ωδε (I will make here) — א B C* 700* it^{b,ff^{2}} vg^{mss} Chromatius^{pt} Jerome
ποιησομεν ωδε (we will make here) — ƒ^{1} 565 1292 𝑙^{866} eth
ποιησωμεν (we can make) — 579 vg^{mss} arm (Diatessaron) Gregory
ποιησωμεν ωδε (we can make here) — C^{c} D E F G H K L O W Γ Δ Θ Σ 0281 ƒ^{13} 28 33 157 180 205 565 597 700^{c} 892 1006 1010 1071 1241 1243 1342 1424 1505 𝔐 Lect lat cop geo slav Origen Chrysostom Chromatius^{pt} Augustine

Matthew 17:5

φωτος (of light) — ƒ^{13} 209 syr^{c}
φωτεινη (bright) — rell

Matthew 17:7

και αψαμενος αυτων ειπεν (and upon them being touched, he said) — א B Θ ƒ^{13} 579 700 892 𝑙^{2211}
ηψατο αυτων και ειπεν (he touched them and said) — C K L W Γ Δ ƒ^{1} 33 565 1241 1424 𝔐 Lect it^{q} syr^{(h)}
και ηψατο αυτων και ειπεν (and he touched them and said) — D

Matthew 17:8

τον Ιησουν μονον μεθ’ εαυτων (only Jesus was with them) — C^{c} 33
τον Ιησουν μονον (only Jesus) — B^{c} C* E F G K L M S U Y Γ Δ Π Ω ƒ^{1} ƒ^{13} 1 2 13 28 35 118 124 157 346 372 565 579 788 892 1005 1071 1424 1582 2358 2372 2737 𝔐 Lect
Ιησουν μονον (only Jesus) — W
μονον τον Ιησουν (Jesus alone) — D lat syr cop arm
Ιησουν αυτον μονον (only Jesus himself) — א
αυτον Ιησουν μονον (only Jesus himself) — B* Θ 700 it^{q}
αυτον μονον (only himself) — Codex Schøyen

Matthew 17:9

εγερθη (may be raised) — B D 1604 it syr^{c} Origen
αναστη (may stand up) — א C E F G H K L M S U (W) Y Z Γ Δ Θ Π Ω ƒ^{1} ƒ^{13} 1 2 13 28 33 35 118 124 157 346 565 579 700 788 892 1005 1071 1241 1424 1582 2358 2372 𝔐 Lect

Matthew 17:10

οι μαθηται αυτου (his disciples) — B C D E F G H K M S U Y Δ Π Ω ƒ^{13} 2 13 28 35 118 157 346 565 579 788 1005 1009 1010 1071 1079 1195 1216 1230 1241 1242 1253 1344 1365 1424 1546 1646 2148 2174 2358 2372 𝔐 Lect it^{f,ff^{2},q} syr^{c,p,h} cop^{bo^{mss},mae,fay} eth Diatessaron Chrysostom
οι μαθηται (the disciples) — א L W Z Θ ƒ^{1} 1 33 124 700 892 1582 it^{a,aur,b,c,d,e,ff^{1},g^{1},l} vg syr^{pal} cop^{sa,bo^{mss}} arm geo Origen Augustine

Matthew 17:11

Ιησους (Jesus) — omitted by א B D L W Z ƒ^{1} 1 33 579 892 1424 1582 lat syr^{c} cop

Matthew 17:11

ελευσεται (will come) — Justin
ερχεται (comes) — א B D W Θ ƒ^{1} 1 22 33 517 579 700 788 (1424) 1582 1675 2737 lat syr^{c} cop
ερχεται πρωτον (comes first) — C E F G H K (L) M S U Y Z Δ Π Ω ƒ^{13} 2 13 28 35 118 124 157 346 372 565 892 1005 1071 2358 2372 𝔐 Lect it^{f,q} syr^{p,h}

Matthew 17:13

του βαπτιστου (the baptist) — omitted by 1424 it^{ff^{1}} syr^{s} Chrysostom

Matthew 17:14

τοτε ηλθον προς αυτον οι μαθηται αυτου (then his disciples came toward him) — Codex Schøyen
και (and) — rell

Matthew 17:15

κυριε (sir) — omitted by א

Matthew 17:15

εχει (he has) — א B L O Z^{vid} Θ Σ 579 2766 Origen Chrysostom
πασχη (he suffers) — 1071
πασχει (he is suffering) — C D E F G H K M S U W X Y Γ Δ Π Ω ƒ^{1} ƒ^{13} 1 2 13 22 28 33 35 118 124 157 346 372 565 700 788 892 1005 1009 1010 1071 1079 1195 1216 1230 1241 1242 1253 1344 1365 1424 1546 1582 1646 2148 2174 2358 2372 2737 𝔐 Lect lat syr cop arm geo Chrysostom

Matthew 17:15

ενιοτε (sometimes) — D Θ ƒ^{1} 22 it^{mss} cop^{mae} arm Origen
text omitted — W
πολλακις (oftentimes) — rell

Matthew 17:17

Ιησους (Jesus) — omitted by א*

Matthew 17:17

πονηρα (evil) — Z 𝑙^{2211}
απιστος (unbelieving) — rell

Matthew 17:19

αυτου (his) — 1071 1424
τω Ιησου (to Jesus) — rell

Matthew 17:20

Ιησους ειπεν (Jesus said) — C E F G (H) K L M S U W X Y Γ Δ Π Ω 2 4 7 8 22 28 35 43 44 118 157 201 438 565 1005 1071 1241 1424 2358 2372 𝔐 Lect it^{f,q} vg^{mss} syr^{p,h}
Ιησους λεγει (Jesus declared) — f^{1} 1 13 346 1582 it^{b,c,e}
ειπεν (said) — it^{a}
λεγει (declared) — א B D Θ 0281 f^{13} 33 124 579 700 788 892 it^{ff^{2},g^{1}} vg^{mss} syr^{s,c} cop

Matthew 17:20

απιστιαν (lack of faith) — C D E F G H K L M O S U W Χ Y Γ Δ Π Σ Ω 2 4 7 8 28 35 43 44 118 157 180 201 205 372 438 565 597 1005 1006 1009 1010 1071 1079 1195 1216 1230 1241 1242 1243 1253 1292 1342 1344 1365 1424 1505 1546 1646 2148 2174 2358 2737 𝔐 Lect latt syr^{s,p,h} slav (Hilary) Chrysostom Jerome Augustine Speculum
ολιγοπιστιαν (little faith) — א Β Θ 0281 f^{1} f^{13} 1 13 22 33 124 346 579 700 788 892 1192 1582 2372 2680 𝑙^{2211} syr^{c,pal} cop arm eth geo Diatessaron Origen John-Damascus

Matthew 17:21

verse omitted — א* B Θ 0281 33 579 788 892* 1604 2680 𝑙^{253} it^{e,ff^{1}} syr^{s,c,pal} cop^{sa,bo,^{mss},mae-2} eth^{ms} geo^{mss} Eusebius

Matthew 17:22

παραγοντων (passing by) — cop^{sa^{mss},mae-2}
στρεφομενων (turning back) — 1582* Origen^{pt}
υποστρεφοντων (returning) — 579
συστρεφομενων (assembling) — א B 0281^{vid} f^{1} 1 118 892 1582^{mg} lat syr^{(pal)} Origen^{pt} Hilary Jerome Augustine
αναστρεφομενων (abiding) — C (D) E F G H K L M O S U W X Y Γ Δ Θ Π Σ f^{13} 2 4 7 8 13 22 28 33 35 43 44 124 157 180 201 205 346 438 565 597 700 788 1005 1006 1009 1010 1071 1079 1195 1216 1230 1241 1242 1243 1253 1292 1342 1344 1365 1424 1505 1546 1646 2148 2174 2358 2372 2737 𝔐 Lect it^{c,(e),ff^{1}} syr^{s,c,p,h} cop^{sa^{mss},bo,mae-1} arm eth slav Chrysostom^{lem}

Matthew 17:23

μετα τρεις ημερας (after three days) — D it^{a,b,c,e,q} syr^{s} cop^{bo}
τη τρι ημερα (on day three) — B* 346^{(c)}
τη τριτη ημερα (on the third day) — rell

Matthew 17:23

αναστησεται (he will arise) — B 047 f^{13} 13 118 124 346 788 892 1424
εγερθησεται (he will be raised) — rell

Matthew 17:23

και ελυπηθησαν σφοδρα (and they were exceedingly aggrieved) — omitted by K 2358

Matthew 17:25

οτε εισηλθεν ο Ιησους (when Jesus entered) — W*
οτε εισηλθον (they entered) — U 8 201
εισελθοντων (upon them entering) — Θ f^{13} 13 124 346 788 it^{a}
εισελθοντα (upon entering) — א^{*,2} 579
εισελθοντι (upon him entering) — D it^{b}
οτε ηλθον (when they had come) — C
ελθοντα (upon arriving) — א^{1} B f^{1} 1 892 1582
ελθοντων αυτων (upon them arriving) — 33
οτε εισηλθεν (when he entered) — E F G H K L M S W^{c} X Y Γ Δ Π Ω 2 4 7 22 28 35 43 44 118 157 438 565 700 892 1005 1071 1241 1342 1424 2358 2372 𝔐 Lect lat syr

Matthew 17:26

λεγει αυτω ο Πετρος (Peter says to him) — (C) E F G K (L) M S U W X^{c} Y Γ Δ Π Σ Ω f^{13} 2 4 7 8 13 22 (28) 35 43 44 118 124 157 180 201 205 346 438 565 579 597 788 1005 1006 1009 1010 1071 1079 1195 1216 (1230) 1241 1242 1243 1253 1292 1342 1344 1365 1424 1546 1646 2148 2174 2372 𝔐 Lect it^{f,(q)} syr^{c,p,h} cop^{(mae)} eth^{ms} geo^{mss} slav Diatessaron Origen^{pt} Basil
λεγει αυτω Πετρος (Peter says to him) — H 28 1505 𝑙^{1223}
λεγει αυτω (He says to him) — D it^{d} syr^{s} cop^{bo^{mss}}
ειποντος δε του Πετρου (Then Peter said) — 892^{mg}
ειποντος δε Πετρου (Then Peter said) — geo^{mss} Origen^{pt} (Juvencus) (Ambrose) John-Damascus
ειποντος δε (Then he said) — (א) B Θ 0281 f^{1} 1 700 892* 1582 lat syr^{pal} cop^{sa,bo^{mss}} arm eth^{mss} geo^{mss} Chrysostom (Jerome)
text omitted — X* 33 2358

Matthew 17:26

αρα γε ελευθεροι εισιν οι υιοι εφη Σιμων ναι λεγει ο Ιησους δος ουν και συ ως αλλοτριος αυτων (Then indeed the sons are free. Simon was saying, "Yes." Jesus says, "Therefore, you too must give as their foreigner.") — 713 Diatessaron Ephraem
αρα τε ελευθεροι εισιν οι υιοι (Then the sons are altogether free.) — 579
αρα γε ελευθεροι εισιν (Then indeed they are free.) — 2372*
αρα γε ελευθεροι εισιν υιοι (Then indeed sons are free.) — X f^{13} 13 118 346 788
αρα γε ελευθεροι εισιν οι υιοι (Then indeed the sons are free.) — rell

37 Textual variants in Matthew 18

Matthew 18:1

ημερα και ωρα (day and hour) — 1071
ημερα (day) — Θ f^{1} 1 33 517 700 713 954 1071 1424 1582 1675 it^{a,aur,b,c,e,ff^{1},ff^{2},g^{1},n,r^{1}} syr^{s,c,pal} arm geo arab^{ms} Origen^{pt}
ωρα (hour) — rell

Matthew 18:2

ο Ιησους (Jesus) — omitted by א B F L Z 078* 0281 f^{1} 1 33^{vid} 700 892* 1241 1582* cop^{bo}

Matthew 18:7

ουαι τω ανθρωπω εκεινω (woe to that man) — B E G H K M N S U (W) X Y Γ Δ Θ Π Ω 0281^{vid} f^{13} 2 4 7 8 13 28 33 35 43 44 118 124 157 201 346 372 438 565 700 788 1005 1009 1010 1071 1079 1195 1216 1230 1241 1242 1253 1344 1365 1424 1546 1646 2148 2358 2372 2737 𝔐 Lect it^{a,b,c,e,f,ff^{1},ff^{2},l,n,q} vg^{mss} cop^{sa^{mss}} arm eth geo Diatessaron Clement Cyprian Adamantius Hilary Lucifer Basil Augustine Cyril John-Damascus
ουαι τω ανθρωπω (woe to a man) — א D F L f^{1} 1 22 579 892 1582 𝑙^{184} it^{aur,d,g^{1}} vg^{mss} syr cop^{sa^{mss},bo,mae} (Origen) Didymus

Matthew 18:8

εξελε αυτον (remove it) — א^{*}
εκκοψον αυτον (cut it off) — א B D L Θ f^{1} f^{13} 1 13 124 157 346 579 788 892 1010 1071 1241* 1424 1582 lat syr^{s,c}
εκκοψον αυτην (cut it off) — U 28 it^{aur}
εκκοψον αυτα (cut them off) — E F G H K M N S W X Y Γ Δ Π Ω 2 4 7 8 22 33 35 43 44 118 201 438 565 700 1005 1241^{c} 2358 2372 𝔐 Lect syr^{h} cop^{bo}

Matthew 18:8

την γεενναν την αιωνιαν (the perpetual Gehenna) — it^{c,e}
την γεενναν του πυρος (the Gehenna of fire) — f^{1} 1 1582 it^{ff^{1}} syr^{c}
το πυρ το αιωνιον (the perpetual fire) — rell

Matthew 18:10

τουτων των πιστευοντων εις εμε (these who are believing in me) — D it^{mss} vg^{mss} syr^{c} cop^{sa^{mss}}
τουτων (these) — rell

Matthew 18:10

εν τω ουρανω (in heaven) — B (33) 892 Basil
text omitted — N* Γ Σ f^{1} f^{13} 1 13 22 1582 it^{aur,e,ff^{1}} syr^{s} cop^{sa^{mss}} Clement Origen Eusebius Didymus^{pt}
εν ουρανοις (in the heavens) — rell

Matthew 18:11

ηλθεν και ο υιος του ανθρωπου ζητησαι και σωσαι το απολωλος (And the Son of Man has come to seek and to save the lost.) — Lect^{pt}
ηλθεν γαρ ο υιος του ανθρωπου ζητησαι και σωσαι το απολωλος (For the Son of Man has come to seek and to save the lost.) — G L^{(mg)} M 157 346 579 713 892^{mg} 1009 1010 1195 1216 1243 1342 1505 𝔐^{pt} Lect^{pt} it^{c} syr^{h} cop^{bo^{mss}} eth slav
ηλθεν γαρ ο υιος του ανθρωπου σωσαι το απολωλος (For the Son of Man has come to save the lost.) — D E F H K N S W X Y Γ Δ Θ^{c} Π Σ Ω 078^{vid} 1^{c} 22 28 180 205 372 565 597 700 1006 1071 1079 1230 1241 1242 1253 1292 1344 1365 1424 1546 1646 2148 2174 2737 𝔐^{pt} Lect^{pt} lat syr^{c,p} arm geo Diatessaron Hilary Chrysostom Chromatius Augustine
Verse omitted — א B L* Θ* f^{1} f^{13} 1* 9 33 146 556 788 837 892* 899* 929* 1294 1502 2317 2680 it^{e,ff^{1}} syr^{s,pal} cop^{sa,bo^{mss},mae} geo^{mss} Origen^{vid} Juvencus Eusebius Apostolic Canons Eusebian Canons Hilary Jerome

Matthew 18:12

ενενηκοντα εννεα προβατα (ninety-nine sheep) — B E^{(*)} Θ f^{13} 13 346 788 1424* cop^{sa^{mss,mae}} arab^{ms}
ενενηκοντα εννεα (ninety-nine) — rell

Matthew 18:14

εμπροσθεν (in front of) — omitted by א 788 cop^{bo}

Matthew 18:14

πατρος υμων (your father) — א D^{c} E G K L M S U V W X Y Δ Π Ω f^{1} 1 2 7 8 22 28 35 43 44 118 201 205 372 438 597 771 1005 1006 1009 1071 1079 1195 1242 1292 1342 1344 1365 1505 1546 1582 2174 2358 2372 2737 𝔐^{pt} Lect^{pt} latt syr^{c,p,h^{mg}} slav Chrysostom Jerome Augustine Speculum
πατρος μου (my father) — B F H N O Γ Θ Σ 078 0281 f^{13} 13 33 124 157 180 346 579 700 788 892 1010 1216 1230 1241 1243 1253 1424 𝔐^{pt} Lect^{pt} syr^{s,h} cop arm eth geo Origen Pseudo-Macarius
πατρος ημων (our father) — D* 4 1646 2148 𝑙^{890} Chrysostom^{mss}
text omitted — syr^{pal} Diatessaron Apostolic Constitutions

Matthew 18:15

αμαρτησει εις σε (if he will sin against you) — (L) Θ 2 118 1071 1195 1344 1546 1646 2372
αμαρτηση εις σε (if he sins against you) — D E F G H K M N O S U W X Y Γ Δ Π Σ Ω 078 f^{13} 4 13 28 44 124 157 205 346 438 565 597 700 788 892 1006 1010 1071 1079 1216 1230 1241 1242* 1243 1253 1292 1365 2174 2358 2737 𝔐 Lect^{pt} latt syr cop^{bo^{mss},mae} arm eth geo slav^{mss} Cyprian Hilary Lucifer Basil^{ms} Pacian Chrysostom^{mss} Chromatius Jerome Augustine^{pt}
αμαρτη εις σε (if he sins against you) — W 7 8 33 35 43 180 201 1009 1242^{c} 1342 (1424) 1505 1582^{c} 2148 Lect^{pt} Basil^{pt} Didymus Chrysostom Theodoret
αμαρτησει (if he will sin) — 579
αμαρτηση (if he sins) — א B 0281 f^{1} 1 22 1582* cop^{sa,bo^{mss}} slav^{mss} Cyril Augustine^{pt}
αμαρτη (if he sins) — Origen^{lem} Basil^{pt}

Matthew 18:16

μαρτυρων (witnesses) — omitted by D it^{d}

Matthew 18:17

σοι λοιπον (to you henceforth) — f^{1} 1 22 1005 1365 1582 2372 cop^{mae-1} Basil^{pt}
text omitted — L
σοι (to you) — rell

Matthew 18:18a

εν τοις ουρανοις (in the heavens) — א D^{c} L 0281 28 33 579 892 it^{c,f} vg^{mss} cop
εν τω ουρανω (in the heaven) — E F G H K M N S U W X Y Γ Δ Π Ω 058^{vid} f^{1} 1 2 4 7 8 13 22 35 43 44 69 118 157 201 346 438 565 700 771 1005 1071 1241 1424 1582 2358 2372 𝔐 Lect
εν ουρανω (in heaven) — B Θ f^{13} 124 788 it^{a,b,e,ff^{2},g^{1},h,q}
text omitted — D*

Matthew 18:18b

εν τοις ουρανοις (in the heavens) — D L M 0281 33 157 579 it^{c,f} vg^{mss} cop
εν τω ουρανω (in the heaven) — E F G H K N S U W X Y Δ Π Ω 058 f^{1} 1 2 4 7 8 13 22 28 35 43 44 69 118 201 346 438 565 700^{c} 771 892 1005 1071 1241 1424 1582 2358 2372 𝔐 Lect
εν ουρανω (in heaven) — א B Θ f^{13} 124 788 it^{a,b,e,ff^{2},g^{1},h,q}
text omitted — 700*

Matthew 18:19

παλιν αμην λεγω (Truly I am again saying) — B E F G H K S Y Π Ω 058 078 4 7 8 13 22 28 33 43 44 157 180 201 205 438 597 700 771 828 1006 1010 1071 1241 1243 1292 1342 1505 𝔐 Lect it^{a,b,c,f,g^{1},h,n,(q),r^{1}} vg syr^{s,c,pal^{mss}} cop^{sa,bo^{ms},mae} geo^{mss} Origen^{lat} Basil
παλιν δε λεγω (But again I am saying) — M N O (W) Δ Σ syr^{h} eth Chrysostom
παλιν ακουετε λεγω (Listen, again I am saying) — it^{e}
λεγω δε (But I am saying) — Cyprian (Speculum)
παλιν λεγω (I am again saying) — א D L Γ f^{1} 1 579 892 1582 𝑙^{524} it^{aur,d,ff^{2},l} vg syr^{p,pal^{ms}} cop^{bo} arm geo^{mss} Origen^{lem} Jerome
αμην λεγω (Truly I am saying) — Θ 124* 565 788 1424 it^{ff^{1}}

Matthew 18:20

ουκ εισιν γαρ δυο η τρεις συνηγμενοι εις το εμον ονομα παρ οις ουκ ειμει εν μεσω αυτων (For there are not two or three who have assembled in my name among whom I am not in their midst.) — D* it^{d,(g^{1})} syr^{s} Clement
ου γαρ εισιν δυο η τρεις συνηγμενοι εις το εμον ονομα εκει ειμι εν μεσω αυτων (For where there are two or three who have assembled in my name, I am there in their midst.) — rell

Matthew 18:24

εκατον (a hundred) — it^{c}
πολλων (many) — א^{*} cop Origen
μυριων (numerous or ten thousand) — rell

Matthew 18:25

ο κυριος (the master) — א B D L 579 it^{a} vg^{mss}
ο κυριος αυτου (his master) — E F G H K M N S U W Y Γ (Δ) Θ Π Ω 0281 f^{13} 2 4 7 8 13 22 28 33 35 43 44 69 118 124 157 201 346 438 565 788 892 1005 1071 1241 1424 2358 2372 𝔐 Lect it vg^{mss} syr^{p,h} cop
text omitted — f^{1} 1 700 1582 it^{g^{1}} syr^{s,c}

Matthew 18:25

εχει (has) — B Θ f^{1} 1 124 1582 arm
ειχεν (had) — rell

Matthew 18:26

δουλος εκεινος (that servant) — א^{c} D L O Δ Θ Σ 0281 33 579 892 lat syr cop^{bo,mae-1}
συνδουλος (fellow-servant) — 13
δουλος (servant) — א^{*} B E F G H K M S U W Y Γ Π Ω 058^{vid} f^{1} f^{13} 1 2 4 7 8 22 28 35 43 44 69 118 124 157 201 346 438 565 700 788 1005 1071 1241 1424 1582 2358 2372 𝔐 Lect it^{q} cop^{sa,mae-2}

Matthew 18:26

κυριε μακροθυμησον (Master, have patience) — א E F G H K L M O S U W Y Δ Π Σ Ω 058 0233 0281 f^{1} f^{13} 1 2 4 7 8 13 22 28 33 35 43 44 69 118 124 157 180 201 205 346 372 438 565 579 597 788 892 1005 1006 1009 1010 1071 1079 1195 1216 1230 1241 1242 1243 1253 1292 1342 1344 1365 1424 1505 1546 1582 1646 2148 2174 2358 2372 2737 𝔐 Lect it^{aur,(b),f,ff^{2},g^{1},(h),q,(r^{1})} vg^{mss} syr^{p,h,pal} cop eth slav Origen^{lat} Asterius Chromatius John-Damascus
μακροθυμησον (Have patience) — B D Θ 700 𝑙^{47}^{*} 𝑙^{76} 𝑙^{184} it^{a,c,d,e,ff^{1},l} vg^{mss} syr^{s,c} arm geo Diatessaron Origen^{pt} Lucifer Chrysostom

Matthew 18:26

και παντα σοι αποδωσω (and I will repay you everything) — E F G H K M S U W Y Γ Δ Π Ω f^{1} 1 2 4 7 8 22 28 35 43 44 118 201 346 438 565 1005 1071 1241 1424 1582 2358 2372 𝔐 Lect it^{f,q}
και παντα αποδωσω σοι (and I will repay everything to you) — א B L 0281 f^{13} 13 33 69 124 157 579 788 892 it^{a,c,g^{1},h} vg syr^{p,h}
και παντα αποδωσω (and I will repay everything) — D 700 it^{b,e,(ff^{1}),ff^{2}} syr^{s}
text omitted — Θ

Matthew 18:27

ο κυριος αυτου (his master) — syr^{c}
text omitted — syr^{s}
ο κυριος του δουλου (the servant's master) — B Θ f^{1} 1 124 1582* cop^{sa^{mss}}
ο κυριος του δουλου εκεινου (the master of that servant) — rell

Matthew 18:27

και πασαν την οφειλην εκεινην (and all that is owed) — 1424
και πασαν την οφειλην (and everything owed) — f^{1} 1 517 954 1582 1675 it^{ff^{1}} cop Origen
και το δανειον (and the debt) — rell

Matthew 18:28

αποδως μοι (You should repay me) — 1424
αποδος μοι (Repay me) — C E F G H K M S U Γ Δ Π^{c} Ω f^{13} 2 4 7 8 13 22 28 35 43 44 69 118 157 201 346 438 556 788 892^{c} 1005 1010 1071 1241 1582^{c} 2358 2372 𝔐 Lect it^{e,f} syr cop^{bo^{ms}}
αποδως (You should repay) — 579
αποδος (Repay) — א B D L W Y Θ Π* 058 f^{1} 1 33 124 565 700 771 892* 1582* lat cop

Matthew 18:29

προσεκυνει αυτον και παρεκαλει (prostrating himself, and imploring) — 28
εις τους ποδας αυτου παρεκαλει (towards his feet, imploring) — C^{c} E F H K M S U V W Y Γ Δ Π Ω f^{13} 2 4 7 8 13 22 33 35 43 44 69* 118 157 201 346 438 565 372 771 788 1005 1071 1241 1582^{c} 2358 2372 2737 𝔐 Lect it^{f,q} syr^{p,h} cop^{mae}
παρεκαλει (imploring) — א B C* D G L Θ 058^{vid} f^{1} 1 69^{c} 71 124 556 579 700 892 1396 1424 1573 1579 1582* lat syr^{s,c,pal} cop^{sa,bo} eth geo

Matthew 18:29

παντα αποδωσω (I will repay all) — א^{1} C^{c} K L W Y Γ Θ Π f^{1} f^{13} 1 13 22 28 33 69 124 157 346 543 556 565 579 771 788 1005 1424 1582 2372 it^{c,f,q} vg cop
αποδωσω (I will repay) — rell

Matthew 18:30

εως ου (until when) — D E F G H K M S U W Y Γ Δ Θ Π Ω f^{1} f^{13} 1 2 4 7 8 13 22 28 33 35 43 44 69 118 124 157 201 346 372 438 556 565 579 700 771 788 1005 1071 1241 1424 1582 2358 2372 2737 𝔐 Lect syr
εως (until) — א B C L 892 it

Matthew 18:30

παν το οφειλομενον (all that he owed) — C 124 892^{mg} 1424 it^{g^{1}}
το οφειλομενον (what he owed) — rell

Matthew 18:31

ουν (Therefore) — א^{*,2} B D 33 it^{e}
δε (But) — א^{1} C E F G H K L M S U W Y Γ Δ Θ Π Ω f^{1} f^{13} 1 2 4 7 8 13 22 28 35 43 44 69 118 124 157 201 346 438 556 565 579 700 771 788 892 1005 1071 1241 1424 1582 2358 2372 𝔐 Lect it cop^{sa,bo}

Matthew 18:32

αυτω (to him) — omitted by D Θ 22 700* 1424 2372 cop^{bo^{ms}}

Matthew 18:33

ουκ εδει ουν ελεησαι (Therefore, are you not obliged to show mercy) — 𝔓^{25}
ουκ εδει ουν και σε ελεησαι (Therefore, should you not also show mercy) — D Θ (lat) cop^{sa^{mss}}
ουκ εδει και σε ελεησαι (Should you not also show mercy) — rell

Matthew 18:34

πας (all) — omitted by D it^{d} syr^{s,c}

Matthew 18:34

αυτω (to him) — omitted by א^{1} B D Θ f^{13} 124 700 788 1424 2148 𝑙^{805} latt syr^{s,c} cop^{sa,bo} arm Diatessaron

Matthew 18:35

των καρδιων υμων τα παραπτωματα αυτων (your^{pl} hearts their trespasses) — C E F G H K M S U W Y Γ Δ Π Ω f^{13} 2 4 7 8 13 22^{mg} 28 33 35 43 44 69 118 124 157 201 346 438 556 565 579 771 788 892^{mg} 1005 1071 1241 1424 1582^{c} 2358 2372 𝔐 Lect it^{f,h} syr^{(p),h,pal}
των καρδιων υμων (your^{pl} hearts) — א B D L Θ f^{1} 1 22* 372 700 892* 1582* 2737 lat syr^{s,c} cop geo eth Origen Speculum

37 Textual variants in Matthew 19

Matthew 19:1

ελαλησεν (spoke) — D it^{a,b,c,d,e,ff^{2},g^{1}} cop^{bo^{mss}}
ετελεσεν (finished) — rell

Matthew 19:2

εκει (there) — omitted by 𝔓^{25}^{vid} it^{h} syr^{s}

Matthew 19:3

οι Φαρισαιοι (some Pharisees) — א D E F G H K S U Γ Ω* 2 7 8 13 22 28 35 43 44 69 157 201 346 438 556 1005 1009 1010 1071 1195^{c} 1216 1230 1241 1242 1253 1344 1365 1424 1646 2148 2174 2358 2372 𝔐 Lect cop^{sa^{mss}} arm Diatessaron Origen Gregory-Nazianzus
Φαρισαιοι (Pharisees) — 𝔓^{25}^{vid} B C L M W Y Δ Θ Π f^{1} f^{13} 1 4 33^{vid} 118 124 565 579 700 771 788 892 1010 1079 1195* 1546 1582 cop^{sa^{mss},bo,mae} John-Damascus

Matthew 19:3

ει εξεστιν τινι ανδρι (whether some husband is permitted) — arm
ει εξεστιν ανδρι (whether a husband is permitted) — 4 273 998 1223 1424^{c}
ει εξεστιν τινι (whether someone is permitted) — 700 geo^{mss}
ει εξεστιν ανθρωπω τινι (whether some man is permitted) — 565
ει εξεστιν ανθρωπω (whether a man is permitted) — א^{c} C D E F G H K M S U W Y Δ Θ Π Ω 087 f^{1} f^{13} 1 2 7 8 13 22 28 33 35 43 44 69 118 124 157 201 346 372 438 771 788 892 1005 1009 1010 1071 1079 1195 1216 1230 1241 1242 1253 1344 1365 1546 1582 1646 2148 2174 2358 2372 2737 𝔐 Lect latt syr cop^{sa,bo,mae-1} eth^{mss} geo^{mss} Diatessaron Origen Hilary Gregory-Nazianzus John-Damascus
εξεστιν ανθρωπω (a man is permitted) — 556
ει εξεστιν (whether it is permitted) — א* B L Γ 517 579 1424* Codex Schøyen eth^{mss} Clement Augustine

Matthew 19:4

ο ποιησας απ’ αρχης ανθρωπον (the maker from the beginning humankind) — 28 vg^{mss}
ο ποιησας απ’ αρχης (the maker from the beginning) — א C D E F G H K (L) M O S U W Y Z Γ Δ Π Σ Ω 0233 f^{13} 2 4 7 8 13 28 35 43 44 (69) 118 157 180 201 205 346 372 438 556 565 (579) 597 700 771 788 892 (1005) 1006 1009 1010 1071 1079 1195 1216 1230 1241 1242 1243 1253 1292 1342 1344 1365 1424 1505 1546 1646 2148 2174 2358 2737 𝔐 Lect lat syr^{c,p,h} slav Diatessaron Origen^{lat} Ambrosiaster Hilary Apostolic-Constitutions Gregory-Nazianzus Chrysostom Jerome Augustine Cyril Speculum John-Damascus
ο ποιησας (the maker) — it^{ff^{1},(ff^{2})} syr^{s}
text omitted — eth^{mss}
ο κτισας απ’ αρχης (the creator from the beginning) — B Θ f^{1} 1 22 33^{vid} 124 700 1582 2372 syr^{pal} it^{e} cop^{sa,bo,mae} arm eth^{mss} geo Origen (Methodius) Origen Serapion Athanasius Titus-Bostra Ps-Clementines

Matthew 19:7

απολυσαι την γυναικα (dismiss the wife) — it^{b,c,ff^{2}} vg^{mss} syr^{s,c} Irenaeus^{lat} Ambrose Speculum
απολυσαι αυτην (dismiss her) — B C E F G H K M N O S U W Y Γ Δ Π Σ Ω 078^{vid} 087^{vid} (0233) f^{13} 2 4 7 8 13 28 33 35 43 44 69 118 124 157 180 201 205 346 438 556 565 597 788 892 1005 1006 1009 1010 1071 1079 1195 1216 1230 1241 1242 1243 1253 1292 1342 1344 1365 1424 1505 1546 1646 2148 2174 2358 𝔐 Lect it^{f,q} syr^{p,h} cop^{(sa),bo^{ms},mae} eth^{mss} slav Chrysostom John-Damascus
απολυσαι (dismiss) — א D L Z Θ f^{1} 1 22 372 579 700 1582 2372 2737 it^{a,aur,d,e,ff^{1},g^{1},h,l} vg^{mss} syr^{pal} arm eth^{ms} geo Diatessaron Origen Jerome Augustine Ps-Chrysostom

Matthew 19:8

λεγει αυτοις ο ιησους (Jesus said to them) — א M it^{a,b,c} cop^{mae}
και λεγει αυτοις (And he said to them) — D*
λεγει αυτοις (He said to them) — rell

Matthew 19:9

παρεκτος λογου πορνειας και γαμηση αλλην ποιει αυτην μοιχευθηναι (except on account of sexual immorality, and marries another, causes her to commit adultery) — syr^{pal}
παρεκτος λογου πορνειας ποιει αυτην μοιχευθηναι (except on account of sexual immorality, causes her to commit adultery) — 𝔓^{25}^{vid} B 0233 1 4 1582 𝑙^{547} it^{ff^{1}} cop^{bo} eth^{mss} slav Origen Cyril
παρεκτος λογου πορνειας και γαμηση αλλην μοιχαται (except on account of sexual immorality, and marries another) — D f^{13} 33 69* (597) 𝑙^{184} 𝑙^{1016} lat syr^{(c)} cop^{sa,bo^{ms},mae} Origen^{lat} Chrysostom Speculum
ει μη επι πορνεια και γαμηση αλλην μοιχαται (except on the basis of sexual immorality, and marries another, causes her to commit adultery) — 69^{c}
μη επι πορνεια και γαμηση αλλην ποιει αυτην μοιχευθηναι (unless on the basis of sexual immorality, and marries another, causes her to commit adultery) — C* 1216
μη επι πορνεια ποιει αυτην μοιχευθηναι (unless on the basis of sexual immorality, causes her to commit adultery) — N
μη επι πορνεια και γαμηση αλλην μοιχαται (unless on the basis of sexual immorality, and marries another, commits adultery) — א C^{c} E F G H K L S Z Γ Δ Θ Π Σ Ω 078 2* 7 8 22 28 43 44 157 180 201 205 438 556 565 579 700 892 1006 1009 1010 1071 1079 1195 1230 1241 1242 1243 1253 1292 1342 1344 1365 1424 1505 1546 1646 2148 2174 𝔐 Lect it^{l} vg syr^{s,p,h} arm eth^{mss} geo Basil Jerome
μη επι πορνεια γαμηση αλλην μοιχαται (unless on the basis of sexual immorality, marries another, commits adultery) — W
και γαμηση αλλην (and marries another) — 1574

Matthew 19:9

ωσαυτως και ο γαμων απολελυμενην μοιχαται (And likewise anyone marrying a divorced woman commits adultery) — 𝔓^{25} cop^{mae-1}
και ο απολελυμενην απο ανδρος γαμων μοιχαται (And anyone marrying a divorced woman sent away by a man commits adultery) — 579
και ο απολελυμενην γαμων (or γαμησας) μοιχαται (And anyone marrying a divorced woman commits adultery) — B C* E F G H K M N O U W Y Z Γ Δ Θ Π Σ Ω 078 0233 f^{1} f^{13} 1 2^{c} 4 7^{mg} 8 13 22 28 33 35 43 44 118 124 157 180 201 205 209^{mg} 346 372 438 556 565 597 700 771 788 892 1005 1006 1009 1010 1071 1079 1195 1216 1230 1242 1243 1253 1292 1342 1344 1365 1424 1505 1582 1646 2148 2174 2358 2372 2737 𝔐 Lect it^{aur,c,f,q} vg^{mss} syr^{p,h,pal} cop^{bo^{mss}} arm eth geo slav Origen^{lat} Basil Cyril Jerome Speculum
text omitted — א C^{c} D L S 2* 7* 69 209* 828 1241 1546 𝑙^{253} 𝑙^{305} 𝑙^{845} 𝑙^{1074} it^{a,b,d,e,ff^{1},ff^{2},g^{1},h,l,r^{1}} vg^{ms} syr^{s,c} cop^{sa,bo^{ms},mae-2} Origen Chrysostom

Matthew 19:10

λεγουσιν οι μαθηται (The disciples said) — א*
λεγουσιν οι μαθηται αυτου (His disciples said) — 𝔓^{25}
λεγουσιν αυτω οι μαθηται (The disciples said to him) — 𝔓^{71}^{vid} א^{c} B Θ it^{e,ff^{1},g^{1}} cop^{sa^{ms},mae} Juvencus Jerome Speculum John-Damascus
λεγουσιν αυτω οι μαθηται αυτου (His disciples said to him) — C D E F G H K L M N S U W Y Z Δ Π Σ Ω 078 0233 f^{1} f^{13} 1 2 13 28 33 35 69 118 124 157 180 205 346 372 565 579 597 700 788 892 1005 1006 1009 1010 1071 1079 1195 1216 1230 1241 1242 1243 1253 1292 1342 1344 1365 1424 1505 1546 1582 1646 2148 2174 2358 2372 𝔐 Lect lat syr cop^{sa^{mss},bo} arm eth geo slav Diatessaron Augustine

Matthew 19:10

ει ουτως εστιν η αιτια (If this is the circumstance) — 892*
ει ουτως αιτιος γινεται ανθρωπος (If this man becomes liable) — 𝔓^{25}
ει ουτως εστιν η αιτια του ανδρος (If this is the circumstance of the husband) — D it^{a,b,c,ff^{2},g^{1},h,q}
ουτως εστιν η αιτια του ανθρωπου (This is the circumstance of the man) — א*
ει ουτως εστιν η αιτια του ανθρωπου (If this is the circumstance of the man) — rell

Matthew 19:11

ο δε Ιησους ειπεν (But Jesus said) — K M* Y Π 771 it^{a,b,c} syr^{c}
ο δε ειπεν (But he said) — rell

Matthew 19:11

των λογων τουτων (of these words) — Θ
τον λογον τουτον (this statement) — א C D E F G H K L M N S U W Y Z Γ Δ Π Σ Ω 078 0233 f^{13} 2 4 7 8 13 22 28 33 35 43 44 69 118 124 157 180 201 205 346 372 438 556 565 579 597 700 771 788 892^{mg} 1005 1006 1009 1010 1071 1079 1195 1216 1230 1241 1242 1243 1253 1292 1342 1344 1365 1424 1505 1546 1582^{c} 1646 2148 2174 2358 2372 2737 𝔐 Lect lat syr^{s,c,p,h} cop^{sa,bo^{mss},mae} arm eth^{mss} geo slav Basilidians^{per Clement} Clement Origen^{lat} Cyprian^{pt} Ps-Cyprian Basil Ambrose Jerome^{pt} Augustine Speculum Theodoret Ammonius-Alexandria John-Damascus
τον λογον (the statement) — B f^{1} 22 892* 1582* 𝑙^{184} it^{e} syr^{pal} cop^{bo^{ms}} eth^{mss} Origen Cyprian^{pt} Apollinaris Jerome^{pt} Theodore John-Damascus^{vid}
text omitted — Chrysostom

Matthew 19:13

προσηνεχθη (he was being brought) — E F G H K M S U W Y Γ Δ Θ Ω 078^{vid} f^{1} f^{13} 1 2 7 8 13 22 28 35 43 44 69 118 124 157 201 346 438 556 565 700 771 788 1005 1071 1582 2358 2372 𝔐 Lect
προσηνεχθησαν (they were being brought) — rell

Matthew 19:16

διδασκαλε αγαθε (Good teacher) — C E F G H K M S U W Y Γ Δ Θ Σ Ω f^{13} 2 4 7 8 13 28 33 35 43 44 69 118 124 157 180 201 205 346 372 438 556 565 579 597 700 771 788 892^{mg} 1005^{mg} 1006 1009 1071 1079 1195 1216 1230 1241 1242 1243 1253 1292 1342 1344 1424 1505 1546 1582^{mg} 1646 2148 2174 2358 2737 𝔐 Lect it^{aur,b,c,f,ff^{2},g^{1},h,l,q,r^{1}} vg syr cop^{sa,bo^{mss},mae-1} arm eth^{ms} geo^{mss} slav Diatessaron Marcus^{per Irenaeus} Justin Origen^{pt} Juvencus Basil Cyril-Jerusalem Chrysostom^{lem} Jerome
διδασκαλε (Teacher) — א B D L 1 22 892* 1005* 1010 1365 1582* 2372 𝑙^{5} it^{a,d,e,ff^{1}} cop^{bo^{mss},mae-2} eth^{mss} geo^{mss} Origen^{pt} Hilary

Matthew 19:16

ποιησας ζωην αιωνιον κληρονομησω (doing [that] I may inherit eonian life) — א L 28 33 157 892 1005 𝑙^{2211} it^{a,b,c,e,f,ff^{2},g^{1},h,q} syr^{s,(c),h^{mg}} cop^{bo}
ποιησω ζωην αιωνιον κληρονομησω (I can do [that] I may inherit eonian life) — 579
ποιησω ινα εχω ζωην αιωνιον (I can do that I may have eonian life) — C E F G H K M S U Y (W) Γ Δ Ω f^{1} f^{13} 1 2 4 7 8 13 22 35 43 44 69 118 124 346 201 438 556 565 700 788 1071 1241 1424 1582 2358 2372 𝔐 Lect
ποιησω ινα σχω ζωην αιωνιον (I can do that I may have eonian life) — B C D Θ 700 syr^{h}

Matthew 19:17

ο δε Ιησους ειπεν (But Jesus said) — E M 33 it^{a,b,c,ff^{2},(h)} syr^{c}
ο δε ειπεν (But he said) — rell

Matthew 19:17

τι με ερωτας περι του αγαθου (Why are you asking me about the good?) — א B (D) L Θ f^{1} 1 22 700 892* 1192* 1424^{(mg)} 1582* 2372 lat syr^{s,c,h^{mg},pal} cop^{bo^{mss},mae} arm geo eth^{mss} Marcion Clement Origen^{pt} Novatian Juvencus Dionysius Eusebius Augustine Antiochus Jerome
τι με λεγεις αγαθον (Why are you calling me good?) — C E F G H K M S U W Y (Δ) Σ Ω f^{13} 2 4 7 8 13 28 33 35 43 44 69 118 124 157 180 201 205 346 372 438 556 565 (579) 788 1005 1006 1009 1010 1071 1079 1195 1216 1230 1241 1242 1243 1253 1292 1342 1344 1365 1424* 1505 1546 1582^{mg} 1646 2148 2174 2358 2737 𝔐 Lect it^{f,q} syr^{p,h} cop^{sa,bo^{ms}} eth^{ms} slav Diatessaron Marcus^{per Irenaeus} Naassenes^{per Hippolytus} Justin Irenaeus Origen^{pt} Hilary Basil Epiphanius Chrysostom
text omitted — Γ

Matthew 19:17

ουδεις αγαθος ει μη ο πατηρ ο εν τοις ουρανοις (None [is] good except the Father who [is] in the heavens) — Clement^{pt}
ουδεις αγαθος ει μη εις ο θεος (None [is] good except the one God) — C E F G H K M S U W Y Γ Δ Σ Ω f^{13} 2^{c} 4 7 8 13 28 33 35 43 44 69 118 124 157 180 201 205 372 438 556 565 (579) 788 1005 1006 1009 1010 1071 1079 1195 1216 1230 1241 1242 1243 1253 1342 1344 1365 1424* 1505 1546 1582^{c} 1646 2148 2174 2358 2737 𝔐 Lect it^{f,g^{1},h,q} syr^{p,h} cop^{sa,bo^{ms}} eth^{ms} slav Irenaeus Origen Dionysius Eusebius Hilary Basil Augustine Antiochus Chrysostom
ουδεις αγαθος ει μη ο θεος (None [is] good except God) — 2* 346 1071
ουδεις εστιν ο αγαθος ει μη εις ο θεος (There is none good except the one God) — 892^{c}
ουδεις εστιν ο αγαθος (There is none good) — 892*
ο γαρ αγαθος εις εστιν ο πατηρ ο εν τοις ουρανοις (For the good is one: the Father who [is] in the heavens) — Ps-Clement
εις εστιν ο αγαθος ο πατηρ μου ο εν τοις ουρανοις (The one good is my Father who [is] in the heavens) — Justin (Juvencus)
εις εστιν ο αγαθος ο πατηρ ο εν τοις ουρανοις (The one good is the Father who [is] in the heavens) — Diatessaron Naassenes^{per Hippolytus}
εις εστιν ο αγαθος ο πατηρ εν τοις ουρανοις (The one good is the Father in the heavens) — Marcus^{per Irenaeus}
εις εστιν ο αγαθος ο πατηρ (The one good is the Father) — Marcion Clement^{pt} it^{e}
εις εστιν ο αγαθος ο θεος (The one good is God) — it^{aur,b,c,(ff^{1}),ff^{2},l,r^{1}} vg syr^{c,h^{mg},pal^{ms}} cop^{bo^{mss},mae} geo^{mss} Novatian Jerome
εις εστιν ο αγαθος (There is one good) — א B^{c} L Θ 1424^{mg} 1582* arm eth^{mss} geo^{mss} Origen
εις εστιν αγαθος (There is one good) — D f^{1} 1 22 700 1192* 2372 it^{a,d}
εστιν ο αγαθος (One is good) — B* syr^{s,pal^{mss}}

Matthew 19:18

ο δε λεγει αυτω ποιας (But he said to him, "Which ones?") — f^{1} 1 1582 it^{f}
ο δε φησι ποιας (But he says, "Which ones?") — 892
ποιας φησιν (He says, "Which ones?") — א L 124 579
λεγει αυτω ποιας (He said to him, "Which ones?") — rell

Matthew 19:18

Ιησους (Jesus) — omitted by 𝔓^{71} F f^{13} 13 124 346 788 1424 it^{e}

Matthew 19:18

ου μοιχευσεις ου κλεψεις (you will not commit adultery, you will not steal) — omitted by א*

Matthew 19:20

εφυλαξαμην εκ νεοτητος μου (I have kept from my youth) — C E F G H K M O S U W (X) Y Γ Δ Σ f^{13} 2 4 7 8 13 28 33 35 43 44 69 124 157 180 201 205 346 438 556 565 597 700^{c} 771 788 892 1005 1006 1010 1071 1241 1243 1292 1342 1424 1505 2358^{vid} 2372 2737 𝔐 Lect it^{a,b,c,e,f,ff^{2},h,n,q} vg^{mss} syr cop arm eth geo slav Origen (Hilary) Marcellus Ambrose Chrysostom Augustine (Cyril)
εφυλαξαμην εκ νεοτητος (I have kept from youth) — it^{d} 372
εφυλαξα εκ νεοτητος μου (I kept from my youth) — א^{c} 118
εφυλαξα εκ νεοτητος (I kept from youth) — D
εφυλαξα (I kept) — א* B L Θ f^{1} 1 22 579 700* 1582 2680 it^{aur,ff^{1},g^{1},l} vg^{mss} Cyprian Jerome

Matthew 19:20

τι ετι υστερω (What am I still lacking?) — omitted by syr^{s}

Matthew 19:21

λεγει (saying) — B Θ f^{13}
εφη (declaring) — rell

Matthew 19:21

ουρανω (heaven) — א E F G H K L M S U W Y Z Δ Θ Ω 0281 f^{1} f^{13} 1 2 4 7 8 13 22 28 33 35 43 44 118 124 157 201 346 438 556 565 579 700 771 788 892 1005 1071 1241 1424 1582 2358 2372 𝔐 Lect lat syr cop^{bo^{mss}}
ουρανοις (heavens) — B C D Γ it^{e,g^{1}} cop^{sa,bo^{ms},mae}

Matthew 19:22

τον λογον τουτον (this statement) — B 372 1230 1253 2737 𝑙^{5} 𝑙^{51} it^{a,b,c,ff^{1},n} vg^{mss} syr^{s,c,p} cop^{bo^{mss},mae} eth geo^{mss} Diatessaron
τον λογον (the statement) — C D E F G H K M S U W X Y Γ Δ Θ Ω f^{1} f^{13} 1 2 4 7 8 13 22 28 33 35 43 44 69 118 124 157 201 346 438 556 565 700 771 788 892 1005 1009 1010 1071 1079 1195 1216 1241 1242 1344 1365 1424 1546 1582 1646 2148 2174 2358 2372 𝔐 Lect it^{aur,d,ff^{2},g^{1},l,q} vg^{mss} syr^{h,pal} cop^{sa,bo^{mss}} arm (Origen)
text omitted — א L Z 0281 579 𝑙^{950} it^{e,f,h} geo^{mss} Chrysostom

Matthew 19:22

χρηματα (riches) — B Clement
κτηματα (possessions) — rell

Matthew 19:24

καμιλον (cable) — 174 579 1424 𝑙^{211} 𝑙^{524} 𝑙^{673} 𝑙^{858} 𝑙^{859} 𝑙^{866} 𝑙^{1086} arm Cyril
καμηλον (camel) — rell

Matthew 19:24

τρυπηματος (borehole) — א^{c} D E F G H L S W X Y Z Γ Δ Ω f^{1} f^{13} 1 2 7 8 13 22 28 33 35 43 44 69 118 201 346 438 556 579 771 788 892 1005 1010 1071 1241 1424 1582 2358 2372 2737 𝔐^{pt} Lect lat
τρυμαλιας (cleft) — C K M U Θ 0281 4 124 157 565 700 𝔐^{pt} 𝑙^{1086} 𝑙^{2211}
τρηματος (hole) — א^{*} B Origen

Matthew 19:24

διελθειν η πλουσιον εις την βασιλειαν του θεου (to pass through (it), than a rich man into the kingdom of God) — 565
διελθειν η πλουσιον εις την βασιλειαν των ουρανων (to pass through (it), than a rich man into the kingdom of the heavens) — it^{ff^{1}} syr^{c}
διελθειν η πλουσιον εις την βασιλειαν του θεου εισελθειν (to pass through (it), than one rich man to enter into the kingdom of God) — G S X Y Γ Ω 7 22 35 43 44 201 372 438 771 1005 1071 2372 2737 𝔐^{pt} Lect^{pt}
διελθειν η πλουσιον εισελθειν εις την βασιλειαν του θεου (to pass through (it), than one rich man to enter into the kingdom of God) — B D Θ 124 700 vg^{mss} syr^{p} cop^{sa^{mss},mae}
διελθειν η πλουσιον εισελθειν εις την βασιλειαν των ουρανων (to pass through (it), than one rich man to enter into the kingdom of the heavens) — it^{a,b,c,e,f,ff^{2},g^{1},h,q} vg^{mss}
εισελθειν η πλουσιον εις την βασιλειαν του θεου εισελθειν (to enter into (it), than one rich man to enter into the kingdom of God) — E H (W) Δ f^{13} 2 4 8 13 28 69 346 556 788 1241 1424 2358 𝔐^{pt} Lect^{pt} syr^{h}
εισελθειν η πλουσιον εισελθειν εις την βασιλειαν του θεου (to enter into (it), than one rich man to enter into the kingdom of God) — 579 syr^{p} cop^{sa^{mss},bo^{mss}}
εισελθειν η πλουσιον εις την βασιλειαν των ουρανων (to enter into (it), than a rich man into the kingdom of the heavens) — Z f^{1} 1 33 118 1582 syr^{s} cop^{bo^{ms}}
εισελθειν η πλουσιον εις την βασιλειαν του θεου (to enter into (it), than a rich man into the kingdom of God) — א L 0281 892

Matthew 19:25

οι μαθηται αυτου (his disciples) — C^{c} E F G H M S U W X Y Σ Ω f^{1} 1 2 4 7 8 22 28 35 43 44 118 157 201 346 438 556 771 1005 1009 1010 1071 1216 1230 1241 1242 1253 1344 1365 1424 1582 2174 2358 2372 𝔐 Lect it^{ff^{1}} syr^{c} cop^{mae} eth geo^{mss} John-Damascus
οι μαθηται (the disciples) — א B C* D K (L) Z Δ Θ f^{13} 13 33 69 124 565 579 700 788 892 1079 1195 1546 1646 2148 𝑙^{2211} lat syr^{s,p,h,pal} cop^{sa,bo} arm geo^{mss} Hilary

Matthew 19:25

εξεπλησσοντο και εφοβηθησαν (they were astonished and frightened) — D it^{mss} vg^{mss} syr^{c}
εξεπλησσοντο (they were astonished) — rell

Matthew 19:26

παρα ανθρωποις (with men) — omitted by א*

Matthew 19:26

παντα δυνατα εστιν (everything is possible) — C^{c} D E F G H M Ω 2 7 8 157 556 1424 2358 𝔐^{pt} Lect^{pt}
παντα δυνατα (all things are possible) — rell

Matthew 19:29

πατερα η μητερα η γυναικα (father or mother or wife) — א C E F G H K L M S U W X Y Γ Δ Θ Σ Ω f^{13} 2 4 7 8 13 22 28 33 35 43 44 69 118 124 157 180 201 205 346 372 438 556 565 579 597 700 771 788 892 1005 1006 1009 1010 1071 1079 1195 1216 1230 1241 1242 1243 1253 1292 1342 1344 1365 1424 1505 1546 (1646) 2174 2358 2372 2737 𝔐 Lect lat syr^{p,h} cop arm eth geo slav Basil Gregory-Nyssa Ambrose Jerome Cyril John-Damascus
πατερα η μητερα (father or mother) — B 2148 it^{a,n} syr^{pal} Clement^{vid} (Victorinus-Pettau) Chrysostom
μητερα (mother) — D it^{b,d,ff^{1},ff^{2}} syr^{s,(c)} Hilary Paulinus-Nola Speculum
γονεις (parents) — f^{1} 1 1582 it^{(e)} Irenaeus^{lat} Origen^{vid}

Matthew 19:29

εκατονταπλασιονα (hundredfold) – א C D E F G H K M S U W X Y Γ Δ Θ Σ f^{1} f^{13} 1 2 4 7 8 13 22 28 33 35 43 44 69 118 124 157 180 201 205 346 372 438 556 565 597 700 771 788 892 1005 1006 1009 1071 1079 1195 1216 1230 1241 1242 1243 1253 1292 1342 1344 1365 1424 1505 1546 1582 1646 2148 2174 2358 2372 2737 𝔐 Lect latt syr^{s,c,p,h} cop^{bo,mae-2} arm eth^{mss} geo slav Irenaeus^{lat} Victorinus-Pettau Asterius Hilary Basil Gregory-Nyssa Ambrose Chrysostom Jerome Paulinus-Nola Speculum
επταπλασιονα (sevenfold) – Ephraem
πολλαπλασίονα (manifold) – B L 579 1010 syr^{pal} cop^{sa,mae-1} eth^{ms} Diatessaron Origen Cyril

51 Textual variants in Matthew 20

Matthew 20:3

ευρεν (found) — D 1424 it^{mss}
ειδεν (saw) — rell

Matthew 20:4

αμπελωνα μου (my vineyard) — א C V Y Θ Π f^{13} 13 33 69 124 346 372 565 579 700 713 788 2737 it^{a,aur,c,e,f,ff^{1},ff^{2},g^{1},h,n,r^{1}} vg^{mss} syr^{h} cop^{sa,mae}
αμπελωνα (vineyard) — B D E F G H K L M S U W X Γ Δ Ω 085^{vid} f^{1} 1 2 4 7 8 22 28 35 43 44 118 157 201 438 556 892 1005 1071 1241 1424 1582 2358 2372 𝔐 Lect it^{b,d,l,q} vg^{mss} syr^{s,c,p,h^{mg}} cop^{bo}

Matthew 20:5

εξελθων ευρεν αλλους εστωτας περι εκτην και ενατην ωραν εποιησεν ωσαυτως (going out, he found others standing around at about the sixth and the ninth hour; he did likewise) — Δ
εξελθων περι εκτην και ενατην εποιησεν ωσαυτως (going out at about the sixth and the ninth, he did likewise) — (22) 579
text omitted — 28*
εξελθων περι εκτην και ενατην ωραν εποιησεν ωσαυτως (going out at about the sixth and the ninth hour, he did likewise) — rell

Matthew 20:6

ενδεκατην ωραν (the eleventh hour) — C E F G H K M S U W X Y Γ Δ Π Ω f^{1} f^{13} 1 2 4 7 8 13 22 28 33 35 43 44 69 118 124 157 201 346 438 556 565 579 771 788 892^{mg} 1005 1071 1241 1424 1582 2358 2372 𝔐 Lect it^{c,e,f,q} syr^{h}
ενδεκατην (the eleventh) — א B D L Θ 085 700 892* it^{a,b,ff^{2},g^{1},h} vg syr^{s,c} Cyril

Matthew 20:6

εστωτας αργους (standing around idle) — C* E F G H K M S U W X Y Γ Δ Π Ω f^{1} f^{13} 1 2 4 7 8 13 22 28 35 43 44 69 118 124 157 201 346 438 556 579 771 788 1005 1071 1241 1424 1582 2358 2372 𝔐 Lect it^{b,f,h,q} syr^{p,h,pal}
εστωτας (standing around) — א B C^{c} D L Θ 085^{vid} 33 372 565 700 892 2737 lat syr^{s,c} cop Origen

Matthew 20:7

αμπελωνα μου και ο εαν η δικαιον ληψεσθε (my vineyard, and whatever will be received by you^{pl} is just) — C^{c} N Π 174 346 565 828 1241 it^{f,h} syr^{c}
αμπελωνα και ο εαν η δικαιον ληψεσθε (the vineyard, and whatever will be received by you^{pl} is just) — C* E F G H K M S U X Y Γ Δ Ω 7 8 22 (28) 33 35 43 44 (69) 118 124 157 201 438 556 (579) 700 771 788 1005 1071 1424 1582^{mg} 2358 2372 𝔐 Lect it^{q} syr^{p,h,pal^{ms}} cop^{bo^{(mss)}}
αμπελωνα και ο εαν η δικαιον λημψεσθαι (the vineyard, and whatever is to be received by you^{pl} is just) — W 2 4 13 892^{mg}
αμπελωνα μου (my vineyard) — D Z 085 372 2737 it^{a,b,d,e,ff^{1},ff^{2},g^{1},l,n,r^{1}} vg^{mss} syr^{s} cop^{sa,mae-2} Cyril
αμπελωνα (vineyard) — א B L Θ f^{1} 1 892* 1582* it^{c} vg^{mss} cop^{bo^{mss},mae-1}

Matthew 20:8

αποδος αυτοις (pay them) — B D E F G H K M N S U W X Y Γ Δ Θ Π Ω f^{1} f^{13} 1 2 4 7 8 13 22 28 33^{vid} 35 43 44 69 118 124 157 201 346 372 438 556 565 579 700 771 788 892 1005 1071 1241 1424 1582 2358 2372 2737 latt syr 𝔐 Lect
αποδος (pay) — א C L Z 085 Origen

Matthew 20:9

verse omitted — 372

Matthew 20:10

και αυτοι (they also) — omitted by 085^{vid} it^{d}

Matthew 20:12

της ημερας και (of the day and) — omitted by 700

Matthew 20:13

συνεφωνησα σοι (I agreed with you) — L Z 33 713 892 syr^{s} cop^{sa^{mss},bo}
συνεφωνησας μοι (you agreed with me) — rell

Matthew 20:14

θελω δε και (but I want also) — E 118 1424 it^{a,b,c,f,ff^{2},g^{1},h,q}
θελω εγω (I want) — B
θελω δε (but I want) — rell

Matthew 20:15

η ουκ (should it not be) — א C E F G H K M N O S U W X Y Γ Δ Π Σ Ω 085 f^{1} f^{13} 1 4 7 8 13 22 28 33 35 43 44 69 118 124 157 180 201 205 346 372 438 556 565 579 597 700 788 892 1005 1006 1009 1010 1071 1079 1195 1216 1230 1241 1242 1243 1253 1292 1342 1344 1365 1424 1505 1546 1582 1646 2148 2174 2358 2372 2737 𝔐 Lect lat syr^{p,h,pal^{mss}} cop geo slav Origen^{lat} Chrysostom Nilus Augustine
ουκ (not) — B D L Z Θ 700 𝑙^{1016} it^{d} syr^{s,c,pal^{ms}} eth

Matthew 20:15

ει ο οφθαλμος μου πονηρος εστιν (If my eye is bad) — 69*
ει οφθαλμος σου πονηρος εστιν (If your eye is bad) — 1 1582
ει ο οφθαλμος σου πονηρος εστιν (If your eye is bad) — B^{c} H S Γ f^{13} 7 8 13 22 28 35 43 44 69 118 124 157 201 346 372 438 556 700 788 1005 1071 2372 2737 𝔐^{pt}
η ο οφθαλμος σου πονηρος εστιν (Or, is your eye bad) — א B* C D E F G K L M N U W X Y Z Δ Θ Π Ω 085 2 4 565 579 892 1424 2358 𝔐^{pt} Lect

Matthew 20:16

πρωτοι εσχατοι πολλοι γαρ εισιν κλητοι ολιγοι δε εκλεκτοι (the first, last; for many are called, but few chosen) — C D E F G H K M N^{vid} O S U W X Y Γ Δ (Θ) Π Σ Ω 0300 f^{1} f^{13} 1 2 7 8 13 22 (28) 33 35 43 44 69 118 124 157 180 201 205 372 438 556 565 597 700 771 788 892^{mg} 1005 1006 1010 1071 1241 1243^{c} 1292 1505 1582 2358 2372 2737 𝔐 Lect latt syr cop^{bo^{mss},mae-1} arm eth geo slav Chrysostom Jerome
πρωτοι εσχατοι γαρ εισιν κλητοι ολιγοι δε εκλεκτοι (the first, last; for they are called, but few chosen) — 346 579
πρωτοι εσχατοι (the first, last) — א B L Z 085 4 5 36 75* 141 278 423* 571 797 892* 1093 1243* 1342 1403 (1424) 1574 1675* 2418* 𝑙^{844} cop^{sa,bo^{mss},mae-2} Diatessaron

Matthew 20:17

μελλων δε αναβαινειν Ιησους (But Jesus, intending to go up) — B syr^{p} cop^{sa^{mss},bo^{ms}}
μελλων δε ο Ιησους αναβαινειν (But intending to go up, Jesus) — 1 1582 Origen^{pt}
και αναβαινων (And going up) — 543 826 828 it^{e,ff^{1}}
και αναβαινων ο Ιησους (And Jesus, going up) — א C D E F G H K L M N S U W X Y Z Γ Δ Θ Π Ω 085 2 4 7 8 (13) 22 28 33 35 43 44 69 118 124 157 201 346 438 556 565 579 700 771 788 892 1005 1009 1010 1071 1079 1195 1216 1230 1241 1242 1253 1344 1365 1424 1546 1646 2148 2174 2358 2372 𝔐 Lect lat syr^{s,c,h} arm eth geo Origen^{(pt)} Chrysostom
αναβαινων ο Ιησους (Jesus, going up) — 𝑙^{76} 𝑙^{333} 𝑙^{950} 𝑙^{1579} 𝑙^{1761}
τω καιρω εκεινω αναβαινων ο κυριος ημων Ιησους Χριστος (At that time, our lord Jesus Christ was going up) — 𝑙^{844}

Matthew 20:17

τους δωδεκα μαθητας αυτου (his twelve disciples) — Γ 7 13 28^{c} 346 713 828 892^{mg} 1010 1216 1342 1424 Lect^{pt} it^{a,aur,c,(e),ff^{1},g^{1},n} vg^{mss} syr^{p} cop^{sa^{mss}} eth^{ms} Origen^{lat} Jerome
τους δωδεκα μαθητας (the twelve disciples) — B C E F G H K M N O S U W X Y Δ Π Σ Ω 085 4 8 22 28* 33 35 43 44 69 118 124 157 180 201 205 372 438 556 565 579 597 700 771 1005 1006 1009 1071 1079 1195 1230 1241 1242 1243 1253 1292 1344 1365 1505 1546 1646 2148 2174 2358 2372 2737 𝔐 Lect^{pt} it^{b,f,ff^{2},h,l,q} vg^{mss} syr^{h} cop^{sa^{mss},mae-1} geo^{mss} slav Hilary Chrysostom^{lem} Augustine
τους δωδεκα αυτου (his twelve) — Codex Schøyen
τους δωδεκα (the twelve) — א D L Z^{vid} Θ f^{1} f^{13} 1 788 892* 1582 it^{d} syr^{s,c} cop^{bo} arm eth^{ms} geo^{mss} Origen^{gr}

Matthew 20:17

εν τη οδω (on the way) — omitted by 1424 𝑙^{10} it^{aur,b,ff^{1},ff^{2},g^{1},l} vg Hilary

Matthew 20:18

εις χειρας ανθρωπων αμαρτωλων (into sinful men's hands) — 28
τοις αρχιερευσιν (to the archpriests) — 085*
τοις αρχιερευσιν και γραμματευσιν (to the archpriests and scribes) — rell

Matthew 20:18

κατακρινουσιν αυτου θανατον (they will judicially decree his death) — 700
κατακρινουσιν αυτον εις θανατον (they will condemn him into death) — א
κατακρινουσιν αυτον (they will condemn him) — B
κατακρινουσιν αυτων θανατω (they themselves will condemn (him) to death) — 579
κατακρινουσιν αυτον θανατω (they will condemn him to death) — rell

Matthew 20:19

και (and) — X 4
και σταυρωσαι (and to crucify) — א*
και σταυρωσαι και θανατωσαι και (and to crucify, and to put to death, and) — 28
και σταυρωσαι και (and to crucify, and) — rell

Matthew 20:19

αναστησεται (he will be stood upright) — B C^{c} D E G H K M S U W X Y Γ Δ Θ Π Ω 085 f^{1} f^{13} 1 2 4 7 8 13 22 28 33 35 43 44 69 118 124 157 201 346 372 438 556 700 771 788 1005 1071 1241 1424 1582 2358 2372 2737 𝔐 Lect
εγερθησεται (he will be raised) — א C* L N Z 579 892 it Origen

Matthew 20:20

απ'/παρ' αυτου (from him) — omitted by 085

Matthew 20:21

ο δε ειπεν αυτοις (But he said to them) — E*
ο δε Ιησους ειπεν αυτη (But Jesus said to her) — L
ο δε ειπεν αυτη (But he said to her) — rell

Matthew 20:21

η δε ειπεν αυτω (But she replied to him) — 118 209
η δε ειπεν (But she replied) — B 565 it^{mss} cop^{sa}
η δε λεγει αυτω (But she says to him) — M N it^{e}
λεγει αυτω και (She says to him, "And) — 579
λεγει αυτω (She says to him) — rell

Matthew 20:21

ουτοι (these) — omitted by C it^{mss}

Matthew 20:21

δεξιων (right) — א B X Origen
δεξιων σου (your right) — rell

Matthew 20:21

ευωνυμων (left) — D E Θ f^{1} 1 22 33 372 565 1582* it^{aur,b,c,d,e,ff^{1},ff^{2},r^{1}} vg^{mss} cop^{mae} arm Origen
ευωνυμων σου (your left) — rell

Matthew 20:22

και το βαπτισμα ο εγω βαπτιζομαι βαπτισθηναι (and to be baptized with the baptism that I am being baptized) — S 2 118 157 (180) 556 892 (1005) 1071 1582^{mg} 𝑙^{673} cop^{bo^{mss}} eth^{mss} geo^{mss} Chrysostom
η το βαπτισμα ο εγω βαπτιζομαι βαπτισθηναι (or to be baptized with the baptism that I am being baptized) — C E G H K M N O S U W X Y Γ Δ Π Σ Φ Ω 0197 4 7 8 13 28 33 35 43 44 69 124 201 205 346 438 565 579 700 771 828 1006 1010 1241 1243 1292 1342 1424 1505 2358 2372 𝔐 Lect it^{(f),h,q} syr^{p,h} arm geo^{mss} slav Marcus^{per Irenaeus} Origen^{lat}
text omitted — א B D L Z Θ 085 1 22 372 788 1582* 2737 lat syr^{s,c} cop^{sa,bo^{mss},mae} eth^{mss} Diatessaron Ambrose Jerome Augustine Speculum

Matthew 20:23

λεγει αυτοις το μεν βαπτισμα ο εγω βαπτιζομαι βαπτισθησεσθε και (He says to them, "Indeed, you^{pl} will be baptized with the baptism that I am being baptized, and") — 1424
και λεγει αυτοις ο Ιησους (And Jesus says to them) — Δ^{(*)} 7 13 69 157 it^{h} cop^{bo}
και λεγει αυτοις (And he says to them) — C E G H K L M N S U W X Y Γ Π Ω 085 2 4 8 22 28 33 35 44 201^{c} 438 556 565 579 892 1071 1241 2358 𝔐 Lect it^{q} syr^{h}
λεγει αυτοις ο Ιησους (Jesus says to them) — D Δ^{c} Θ 124 346 788 it^{a,b,c,e,ff^{2}} syr^{s,c} cop^{mae}
λεγει αυτοις (He says to them) — א B Z f^{1} 1 43 118 201* 700 1005 1582 2372 it^{f,g^{1}} syr^{p} cop^{sa}

Matthew 20:23

πιεσθε και το βαπτισμα ο εγω βαπτιζομαι βαπτισθηναι (you^{pl} will drink, and you^{pl} will be baptized with the baptism that I am being baptized) — C E G (H) (K) M N S U W X Y Γ Δ Π Ω 0197 2 4 7 8 13 28 33^{vid} 35 43 44 (69) 118 124 157 201 346^{vid} 438 556 565 579 700 771 (892) 1005 1071 1241 1582^{mg} 2358 2372 𝔐 Lect it^{b,f,h,q} syr^{p,h} cop^{bo^{mss}}
πιεσθε (you^{pl} will drink) — א B D L Z Θ 085 1 22 372 788 1582* 2737 lat syr^{s,c} cop^{sa,bo^{mss},mae}

Matthew 20:23

και εξ ευωνυμων μου τουτο (and that one at my left) — U
και εξ ευωνυμων τουτο (and that one at the left) — 565
και εξ ευωνυμων μου (and at my left) — E G H W X Γ Π^{c} 2 4 7 8 22 35 43 44 69 118 201 556 700 771 788 1241 2358 𝔐^{pt} syr^{s,c}
και ευωνυμων μου (and my left) — Δ
και εξ ευωνυμων (and at the left) — א C D K M N S Y Z Π* Ω 085 f^{13} 13 28 124 157 346 372 438 579 892 1005 1071 1582* 2372 2737 𝔐^{pt} it^{g^{1},q} arm
η εξ ευωνυμων μου (or at my left) — it^{c,h,l} 1582^{mg}
η εξ ευωνυμων (or at the left) — B L Θ 1 33 1424 it^{a,b,e,f,ff^{2}} vg^{mss} cop^{sa,bo^{mss},mae} Origen Epiphanius

Matthew 20:23

παρα του πατρος μου (from my father) — 700 1005 1424
απο του πατρος μου (from my father) — L
text omitted — 7 𝑙^{339}
υπο του πατρος μου (by my father) — rell

Matthew 20:24

ηρξαντο αγανακτιν (they began to be resentful) — א
ηγανακτησαν (they resented) — rell

Matthew 20:26

ουχ ουτω δε εσται εν υμιν (But it will not be thus among you^{pl}) — 085 syr^{c}
ουχ ου δε εσται εν ημιν (But of which it will not be among us) — 579
ουχ ουτως εσται εν υμιν τοις φιλοις μου (It will not be like this among you^{pl}, my friends) — 1071
ουχ ουτως δε εσται υμιν (But it will not be like this for you^{pl}) — 201
ουχ ουτως εσται υμιν (It will not be like this for you^{pl}) — 35
ουχ ουτως εστε εν υμιν (Let it not be like this among you^{pl}) — א Δ
ουχ ουτος εσται εν υμιν (It will not be thus among you^{pl}) — K 13
ουχ ουτως δε εσται εν υμιν (But it will not be like this among you^{pl}) — C M X Γ 7 8 28 33 35 43 438 556 892 1424 1582^{c} 2358 𝔐^{pt} it^{ff^{2}}
ουχ ουτως εσται εν υμιν (It will not be like this among you^{pl}) — E G H K L N O S U W Y Θ Π Ω f^{1} 1 2 4 22 44 69 118 124 157 180 205 346 565*^{vid} 597 700 771 788 1005 1006 1010 1241 1243 1292 1342 1505 1582* 2372 𝔐^{pt} Lect lat cop^{sa^{mss},bo,mae} arm eth geo^{mss} slav Origen^{lat} Jerome
ουχ ουτως εστιν εν υμιν (It is not like this among you^{pl}) — B D Z 0281 it^{d} cop^{sa^{mss}} geo^{mss} Speculum

Matthew 20:26

αλλ' ος αν θελη εν υμιν μεγας γενεσθαι εσται υμων διακονος (Instead, whoever among you^{pl} is wanting to become great will be your^{pl} servant) — omitted by E*

Matthew 20:26

εστε υμων διακονος (he is to be your^{pl} servant) — א^{*} D
εστω υμων διακονος (let him be your^{pl} servant) — א^{c} H L M S 2 4 43 44 28 157 438 892 1005 1010 1071 2372 𝔐^{pt} it^{f,g^{1}} vg syr^{c} cop^{sa^{ms}bo,mae}
εσται υμων διακονος (he will be your^{pl} servant) — B C E^{mg} G K U W X Y Δ Θ Π Ω 085 f^{1} f^{13} 1 7 8 13 22 33 35 69 118 124 201 346 556 565* 579 700 771 788 1424 1582 2358 𝔐^{pt} Lect it^{a,b,c,e,ff^{2},h,q} cop^{sa^{mss}}

Matthew 20:27

εσται παντων δουλος (he will be bondservant of all) — M
εστε υμων δουλος (he is to be your^{pl} bondservant) — א D
εστω υμων δουλος (let him be your^{pl} bondservant) — B E G H S X Y Γ Π^{c} Ω 2 7 8 22 28 43 44 438 556 579 1005 1010 1071 1424 2358 2372 𝔐^{pt} syr^{c} cop^{bo,mae}
εσται υμων δουλος (he will be your^{pl} bondservant) — 𝔓^{45}^{vid} C K L N U W Δ Θ Π* 085 f^{1} f^{13} 1 4 13 33 35 69 118 124 157 201 346 565 700 771 788 892 1582 𝔐^{pt} Lect lat cop^{sa}

Matthew 20:28

πολλων υμεις δε ζητειτε εκ μικρου αυξησαι και εκ μειζονος ελαττον ειναι εισερχομενοι δε και παρακληθεντες δειπνησαι μη ανακλεινεσθαι εις τους εξεχοντας τοπους μηποτε ενδοξοτερος σου επελθη και προσελθων ο δειπνοκλητωρ ειπη σοι ετι κατω χωρει και καταισχυνθηση εαν δε αναπεσης εις τον ηττονα τοπον και επελθη σου ηττων ερει σοι ο δειπνοκλητωρ συναγε ετι ανω και εσται σοι τουτο χρησιμον (many. But seek ye to increase from the least, and to be greater from among the lesser. But upon entering and being invited to dine, do not recline among the preeminent places, lest someone more reputable than you comes and the dinner host approaching should say to you, "Take a place further down," and you will be humiliated. But if you recline in the lesser place and someone lesser than you comes, the dinner host will say to you, "Congregate further up," and this will be useful to you.) — D it^{a,aur,b,c,d,e,ff^{1},ff^{2},g^{2},h,n,r^{1},r^{2}} vg^{mss} syr^{p^{ms},h^{mg}}
πολλων υμεις δε ζητειτε εκ μικρου αυξησαι και μη εκ μειζονος ελαττον ειναι παρακληθεντες δειπνησαι μη ανακλινεσθε εις τον εξεχοντα τοπον μηποτε ενδοξοτερος σου επελθη και ο δειπνοκλητωρ ειπη σοι κατω χωρει και καταισχυνθηση ενωπιον των ανακειμενων εαν δε αναπεσης εις τον ηττονα τοπον και επελθη σου ηττων ερει σοι ο δειπνοκλητωρ συναγε ετι ανω και εσται σοι και εσται σοι δοξα ενδοξοτερος ενωπιον των ανακειμενων (many. But seek ye to increase from the least, and not to be lesser from greater. Upon being invited to dine, do not recline^{pl} in the preeminent place, lest someone more reputable than you comes and the dinner host should say to you, "Take a place lower," and you will be humiliated in the presence of those who are reclining. But if you recline in the lesser place and someone lesser than you comes, the dinner host will say to you, "Congregate further up," and it will be an honor to you, something reputable in the presence of those who are reclining.) — syr^{c}
πολλων υμεις δε ζητειτε εκ μικρου αυξησαι εκ μειζονος ελαττον ειναι εισερχομενοι δε και παρακληθεντες δειπνησαι μη εις τους εξεχοντας τοπους ανακλινεσθε μηποτε ενδοξοτερος σου επελθη και προσελθων ο δειπνοκλητωρ ειπη σοι ετι κατω χωρει και καταισχυνθηση εαν δε αναπεσης εις τον ηττονα τοπον και επελθη σου ηττων ερει σοι ο δειπνοκλητωρ αγε ετι ανω και εσται σοι τουτο χρησιμωτερον (many. But seek ye to increase from the least, to be greater from among the lesser. But upon entering and being greeted, do not recline^{pl} to dine among the preeminent places, lest someone more reputable than you comes and the dinner host approaching should say to you, "Take a place further down," and you will be humiliated. But if you recline in the lesser place and someone lesser than you comes, the dinner host will say to you, "Come further up," and this will be more useful to you.) — Φ
πολλων υμεις δε ζητειτε εκ μικρου αυξησαι και εκ μειζονος ελαττον ειναι εισερχομενοι δε και παρακληθεντες δειπνησαι μη ανακλεινεσθαι εις τους εξεχοντας τοπους μηποτε ενδοξοτερος σου επελθη και προσελθων ο δειπνοκλητωρ ειπη σοι κατω χωρει και καταισχυνθηση εαν δε αναπεσης εις τον ηττονα τοπον και επελθη σου ηττων ερει σοι ο δειπνοκλητωρ συναγε ετι ανω και εσται σοι και εσται σοι δοξα ενδοξοτερος ενωπιον των ανακειμενων (many. But seek ye to increase from the least, and to be greater from among the lesser. But upon entering and being invited to dine, do not recline among the preeminent places, lest someone more reputable than you comes and the dinner host approaching should say to you, "Take a place lower," and you will be humiliated. But if you recline in the lesser place and someone lesser than you comes, the dinner host will say to you, "Congregate further up," and it will be an honor to you, something reputable in the presence of those who are reclining.) — it^{e}
πολλων υμεις δε ζητειτε εκ μικρου αυξησαι και εκ μειζονος μειζον γενεσθαι (many. But seek ye to increase from the least, even to become greater from the greater) — it^{g^{1},m}
πολλων υμεις δε ζητειτε εκ μικρου αυξησαι και εκ μειζονος ελαττον ειναι (many. But seek ye to increase from the least, and to be greater from among the lesser) — it^{f,q}
πολλων (many) — rell

Matthew 20:29

εκπορευομενου του Ιησου (Jesus departed) — C^{c} G 2^{c} 4 it^{e} 𝑙^{339} 𝑙^{(1086)}
εκπορευομενου αυτου (he departed) — H Δ 7 33
εκπορευομενων αυτων (they departed) — rell

Matthew 20:29

ηκολουθησαν οχλοι πολλοι (many throngs followed^{pl}) — 𝔓^{45}^{vid}
ηκολουθησεν οχλος πολυς (a large crowd followed^{sg}) — א*
ηκολουθησαν αυτω οχλοι πολλοι (many throngs followed^{pl} him) — D 1424 it^{c,e,q} vg^{mss} syr^{h} cop^{bo^{mss}}
ηκολουθησαν αυτω οχλος πολυς (a large crowd followed^{pl} him) — Γ 4 1241
ηκολουθησεν αυτω οχλος πολυς (a large crowd followed^{sg} him) — rell

Matthew 20:30

κυριε ελεησον ημας Ιησους (Lord! Have mercy on us, Jesus) — L 892 syr^{pal^{mss}} cop^{sa^{mss},bo^{(mss)}}
κυριε ελεησον ημας (Lord! Have mercy on us) — B Z^{vid} 085 0281 372 (2737) it^{aur,g^{1},l,r^{1}} vg cop^{sa^{mss},bo^{(ms)}} eth^{mss} Jerome Augustine
ελεησον ημας κυριε Ιησους (Have mercy on us, Lord, Jesus) — N Σ 124 1689 syr^{pal^{mss}}
ελεησον ημας κυριε (Have mercy on us, Lord) — 𝔓^{45}^{vid} C E G H K M O S U W X Y Γ Δ Π Ω 1 2 4 7 8 22 28 33 35 43 44 180 201 438 556 579 597 771 1005 1006 1009 1010 1071 1079 1195 1216 1230 1241 1242 1243 1253 1292 1342 1365 1424 1505 1546 1582 1646 2138 2174 2358 2372 𝔐 Lect it^{f,q} syr^{p,h} cop^{sa^{ms}} eth^{mss} geo^{ms} slav Origen Chrysostom^{lem} John-Damascus
ελεησον κυριε (Show mercy, Lord) — 1344
ελεησον ημας Ιησους (Have mercy on us, Jesus) — א Θ 13 69 700 788 𝑙^{547} it^{c,e,h,n} syr^{pal^{ms}} Codex Schøyen arm geo^{mss}
ελεησον ημας (Have mercy on us) — D 118 157 205 209 346 565 1346 𝑙^{76}^{vid} 𝑙^{1016} it^{a,b,d,ff^{1},ff^{2}} syr^{c} cop^{sa^{ms},mae-1} eth^{ms}

Matthew 20:31

verse omitted — 2* 157

Matthew 20:31

πολλω μαλλον (much more) — א
περισσως (all the more) — 1071
μειζον ως (greater like it) — 1424
πλεον (more) — Δ
μειζον or μειζων (greater) — rell

Matthew 20:31

εκραυγασαν (they shouted) — 𝔓^{45} 13 788
εκραυγαζον (they were shouting) — Θ Φ 69 124 346
εκραζον (they were crying out) — א^{c} C E G H K M N S U W X Y Γ Δ Π^{c} Ω f^{1} 1 2^{c} 4 7 8 22 28 33 35 43 44 118 201 372 438 556 565 579 771 1005 1071 1241 1424 1582 2358 2372 2737 𝔐 Lect latt
εκραξαν (they cried out) — א B D L Z Π* 085 0281 700 892

Matthew 20:31

κυριε (lord) — omitted by 13 118 205 209 579 700 1675 𝑙^{1016} it^{e} vg^{ms} syr^{pal^{mss}} slav^{mss}

Matthew 20:32

ειπεν (said) — 346
text omitted — 579
και ειπεν (and he said) — rell

Matthew 20:32

τι θελε ποιησω υμιν (You wish I do what to you^{pl}?!?) — 1071
τι θελεις ποιησω υμιν (What are you wishing I do to you^{pl}?) — C
τι θελεται ινα ποιησω υμιν (What do you wish that I do to you^{pl}?) — 579
τι θελεται ποιησω υμιν (What do you wish I do to you^{pl}?) — D W Θ 2
τι θελετε ποιησαι με υμιν (What are you^{pl} wanting me to do to you^{pl}?) — 28 syr^{c}
τι θελετε ινα ποιησω υμιν (What are you^{pl} wishing that I do to you^{pl}?) — א^{c} L 565 it^{c,f,ff^{2},g^{1},h,q}
τι θελετε ποιησω υμιν (What are you^{pl} wishing I do to you^{pl}?) — rell

Matthew 20:33

ινα ανοιγωσιν οι οφθαλμοι υμων και ωστε ηγγισαν εις Ιεροσωλυμα ("that your^{pl} eyes be opened." And so they drew near to Jerusalem.) — 579*
ινα ανοιγωσιν οι οφθαλμοι υμων ("that your^{pl} eyes be opened") — א^{*} 579^{c}
ινα ανοιγωσιν οι οφθαλμοι ημων λεγει αυτοις ο Ιησους πιστευετε οτι δυναμαι τουτο ποιησαι λεγουσιν αυτω ναι κυριε (that our eyes be opened. Jesus says to them, "Are you^{pl} believing that I am able to do this?" They say to him, "Yes sir.") — it^{c}
ινα ανοιγωσιν οι οφθαλμοι ημων και βλεπωμεν σε (that our eyes be opened, and we might see you) — syr^{c}
ινα ανοιγωσιν οι οφθαλμοι ημων (that our eyes be opened) — rell

Matthew 20:34

των ομματων (the eyes) — Θ
των ομματων αυτων (their eyes) — (B) D L Z f^{13} 13 69 124 788 892 it Origen
των οφθαλμων αυτου (his eyes) — א^{*}
των οφθαλμων αυτων (their eyes) — א^{c} C E G H K M N S U W X Y Γ Δ Ω Π f^{1} 1 2 4 7 8 22 28 33 35 43 44 118 157 201 346 372 556 565 579 700 771 1005 1071 1241 1424 1582 2358 2372 2737 𝔐 Lect

Matthew 20:34

ανεβλεψαν αυτων οι οφθαλμοι (their eyes regained eyesight) — C E G H K M N S U W X Y Γ Δ Π Ω 2 4 7 8 13 35 43 44 69 118 124^{c} 157 201 346 438 556 565 579 1005 1071 1241 1424 2358 2372 𝔐 Lect it^{q} syr^{p,h} cop^{sa^{ms}}
ανεβλεψαν (they regained eyesight) — א B D L Z^{vid} Θ f^{1} 1 22 28 33 124* 372 700 788 892 1582 2737 lat syr^{c} cop^{sa^{mss},bo,mae}

24 Textual variants in Matthew 21

Matthew 21:1

ηγγισεν (he approached) — C^{(c)} 892 Lect^{pt} it^{b,e,ff^{2}} vg^{mss} syr^{c,p} cop^{bo^{mss}}
ηγγισαν (they approached) — rell

Matthew 21:1

ηλθεν (he came) — א^{*} C^{c} E S U W Δ 2 28 892 𝔐^{pt} Lect^{pt} it^{e,ff^{2},q} syr^{c,p} cop^{sa^{ms},mae} Origen
ηλθον (they came) — א^{c} B C* D G H K L M N X Y Θ Π Ω f^{1} f^{13} 1 4 7 8 13 22 33 35 43 44 69 118 124 157 201 346 438 556 565 579 700 771 788 1005 1071 1424 1582 2358 2372 lat cop^{sa^{mss},bo}

Matthew 21:1

Βηθφαγη και βηθανιαν και (Bethphage and Bethany and) — C
Βηθφαγη και βηθανιαν (Bethphage and Bethany) — f^{13} 13 33 69 346
Βηθφαγη (Bethphage) — rell

Matthew 21:1

εις το ορος των ελαιων (into the mount of olives) — B C^{(c)} 33 it
text omitted — 28
προς το ορος των ελαιων (toward the mount of olives) — rell

Matthew 21:1

ο κυριος ημων Ιησους ο Χριστος (our lord Jesus Christ) — 𝑙^{844} 𝑙^{2211}
ο Ιησους (Jesus) — א C^{c} G K L M N U W Y Γ Δ Θ Π f^{1} f^{13} 1 4 7 8 13 22^{c} 33 35 43 69 118 124 157 201 346 438 556 565 579 771 788 892 1005 1071 1424 1582 2358 2372 𝔐^{pt} Lect
Ιησους (Jesus) — B C* D E H S X Ω 2 22* 28 44 700
text omitted — 1241

Matthew 21:1

δυο των μαθητων αυτου (two of his disciples) — Θ f^{13} 13 28 33 69 124 157 346 788 1005 it^{b,c,e,f,ff^{2},g^{1},h,q}
δυο μαθητας (two disciples) — rell

Matthew 21:2

ευθυς (straightaway) — א L
text omitted — 482 544 it^{a,b,c,h} syr^{c} cop^{bo}
ευθεως (immediately) — rell

Matthew 21:2

ευρησεται (it will be found) — D W Δ Θ 2 8 1071
ευρησετε (you^{pl} will find) — rell

Matthew 21:3

τι ποιειται ουτως ερειτε (anything, do like this: you^{pl} will say) — 157
τι ποιειται ερειτε (anything, do this: you^{pl} will say) — D it^{d} Eusebius
τι ερειται (anything, it will be said) — L W
τι ερειτε (anything, you^{pl} will say) — rell

Matthew 21:3

αυτων εχει χρειαν εχει (he has need of having them) — D
αυτου χριαν εχει (he has need of it) — א Θ
αυτου χρειαν εχει (he has need of it) — 579
αυτων χρειαν εχει (he has need of them) — rell

Matthew 21:3

και ευθεως (and immediately) — D 33 syr^{c}
και ευθυς (and straightaway) — it
ευθυς δε (but straightaway) — א B L Θ 700 788 892 it^{q}
ευθεως δε (but immediately) — rell

Matthew 21:3

απεστειλεν (he sent away) — 1424 syr^{c}
αποστελη (you will be sent away) — H
αποστελλει (he sends away) — C E G K L N S U W X Y Z Γ Δ Θ Π Ω f^{1} f^{13} 1 4 7 8 2 13 22 28 33 35 43 44 118 124 201 346 438 556 565 579 700^{c} 771 788 892 1071 1241 1582^{c} 2358 2372 𝔐 Lect it^{d,h}
αποστελει (he will send away) — א B D M 69 157 700* 1005 1582* 𝑙^{1} lat cop

Matthew 21:4

ολον γεγονεν (all happened) — B C^{c} E G H K M N S U W X Y Γ Δ Π Ω f^{1} f^{13} 1 2 4 7 8 13 22 28 33 35 43 44 69 118 124 157 201 346 438 556 565 579 700 771 788 1005 1071 1424 1582 2358 2372 𝔐 Lect it^{q} vg^{mss} syr^{h} cop^{sa,bo^{ms},mae-1} arm geo
γεγονεν (happened) — א C* D L Z Θ 372 892 1241 2737 𝑙^{844} 𝑙^{2211} it vg^{mss} syr^{c,p} cop^{bo} Origen

Matthew 21:4

υπο του προφητου (by the prophet) — L Z Θ f^{13} 13 69 124 700 788 892 syr^{c}
δια του ζαχαριου προφητου (through Zechariah the prophet) — M^{mg} 42 it^{a,c,h} cop^{bo^{ms}} Chrysostom Hilary
δια Ησαιου προφητου (through Isaiah the prophet) — it^{r^{2}} vg^{mss} cop^{bo^{ms}} eth
δια του προφητου (through the prophet) — rell

Matthew 21:5

επι πωλον ονον νεον υποζυγιον (upon a foal, a young donkey, a draft animal) — it^{b}
επι πωλον υιον ονου (upon a foal, a son of a donkey) — Codex Schøyen
επι ονον και επι πωλον νεον (upon a donkey – even upon a young foal) — 1 1582 Origen^{pt}
επι ονον πωλον υιον υποζυγιου (upon a donkey, a foal, a son of a draft animal) — 69
επι ονον και πωλον υιον υποζυγιου (upon a donkey – even a foal, a son of a draft animal) — C D E F G H K M S U W X Y Γ Δ Θ Π Ω f^{13} 2 4 7 8 13 22 28 33 35 43 44 118 157 201 346 372 438 556 565 579 771 788 892 1005 1071 1241 1424 2358 2372 2737 𝔐 Lect lat cop^{bo,mae-1} Origen^{pt}
επι ονον και επι πωλον υποζυγιου (upon a donkey – even upon a foal of a draft animal) — א^{c} L Z^{vid} it^{e}
επι ονον και επι πωλον υιον υποζυγιου (upon a donkey – even upon a foal, a son of a draft animal) — א^{*} B N 124 700 𝑙^{844} syr cop^{sa}

Matthew 21:6

εποιησαν (they did) — D it
και ποιησαντες (and upon them doing) — rell

Matthew 21:6

ως (as) — 565
καθα (exactly as) — G 157
καθως (accordingly) — rell

Matthew 21:6

συνεταξεν (coordinated) — B C D 33 700 it
προσεταξεν (ordered) — rell

Matthew 21:6

ο Ιησους (Jesus) — omitted by 28 579

Matthew 21:7

αυτω (it) — f^{13}
επ' αυτω (upon it) — Θ 33
επ' αυτον (upon it) — D 𝑙^{2211} it^{a,b,e,f,ff^{2},q}
επ' αυτων (upon them) — א B L Z 69 788 892* it^{c,g^{1},h} syr^{p}
text omitted — syr^{c}
επανω αυτων (over them) — rell

Matthew 21:7

ιματια (cloaks) — א* B D Θ 2^{c} it^{b,e,ff^{1},ff^{2}}
ιματια αυτων (their cloaks) — rell

Matthew 21:7

επεκαθισεν επανω αυτων (he sat on top of them) — B C F H M U X Δ Ω f^{1} f^{13} 7 8 11 13 22 28 33 35 44 69 118 124 157 201 438 500 501 502 771 788 901 1005 1071 1582 1701 2372 𝔐 Lect it^{q}
επεκαθισαν επανω αυτων (they sat on top of them) — 579 vg
επεκαθισαν επανω αυτον (they sat on top of it) — א^{c} L 892
επεκαθισαν επανω αυτης (they sat on top of her) — 2^{c}
εκαθησεν επανω αυτου (he sat down over top of it) — Θ it^{f,h}
εκαθισεν επανω αυτων (he sat down on top of them) — K N S W Y Π 9 10 12 43 490 565 1424
εκαθισεν επανω επ' αυτων (he sat down over upon them) — 556
εκαθισαν επανω αυτων (they sat down on top of them) — 4
εκαθισαν επανω επ' αυτων (they sat down over upon them) — א^{*}
εκαθητο επανω αυτου (he was seated over top of it) — D it^{b,c,e,ff^{2}}
εκαθητο επανω αυτων (he was seated on top of them) — 700 it^{a,g^{1}}
text omitted — E G 1 2^{*} 2358

Matthew 21:9

και εξηλθον εις υπαντησιν αυτω πολλοι χαιροντες και δοξαζοντες τον θεον περι παντων ων ειδον — (Φ) syr^{c}

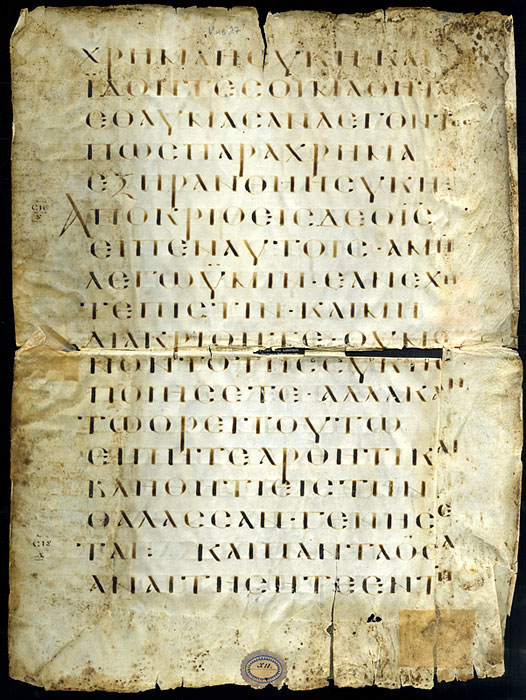
Matthew 21:19-24 from Uncial 087

Matthew 21:23

διδασκοντι (while he was teaching) – omitted by 7 it^{a, b, c, ff^{1}, ff^{2(c)}, h, l, r^{1}} vg^{mss} syr^{s,c} Hippolytus Origen^{pt}

Matthew 21:31

ὁ πρῶτος (the first) — א, C*, K, W, Δ, Π, 𝔐/Byz
ὁ δεύτερος (the second) — 4, 273
ὁ ὕστερος (the latter) — B
ὁ ἔσχατος (the last) — D, Θ, ƒ^{13}

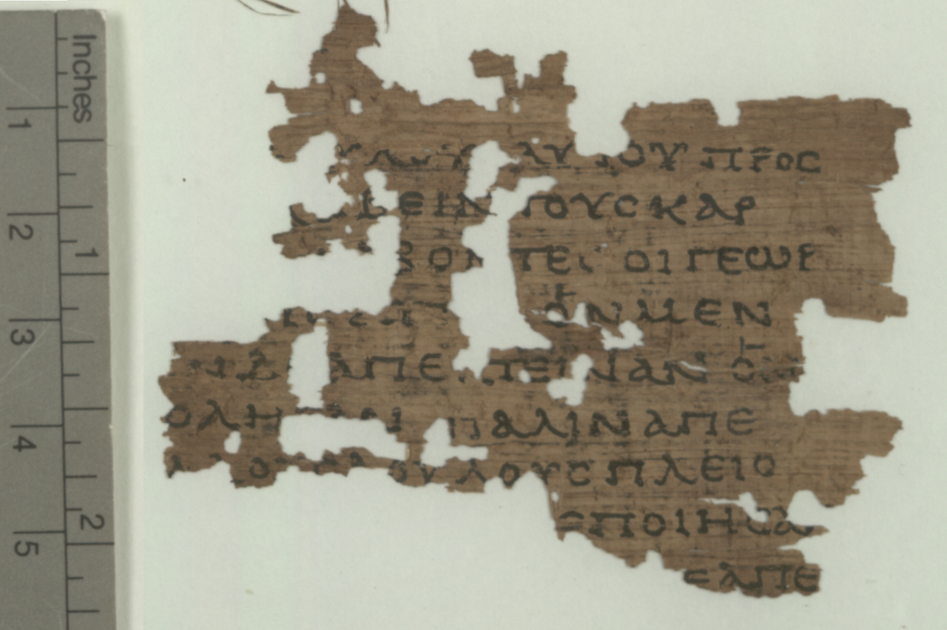
Matthew 21:34-37 in Papyrus 104

Matthew 21:38

σχωμεν — א B D L Z f^{1} 33 pc syr^{s.c}
κατασχωμεν — C W 0138 f^{13} Byz ff^{1} q syr^{p.h}

Matthew 21:44

Καὶ ὁ πεσὼν ἐπὶ τὸν λίθον τοῦτον συνθλασθήσεται ἐφ ὃν δ' ἂν πέσῃ λικμήσει αὐτόν (And he who falls on this stone will be broken to pieces; but when it falls on any one, it will crush him) — א, B, C, K, L, W, X, Δ, Π, 0138, 33, 892, 1010, 1546, f^{1}, f^{13}, 28, 565, 700, 892, 1009, 1010, 1071, 1195, 1216, 1230, 1241, 1242, 1253, 1344, 1365, 1646, 2148, 2174, Byz, Lect, it, vg, syr, cop, arm, eth, geo
ὁ πεσὼν ἐπὶ τὸν λίθον τοῦτον συνθλασθήσεται ἐφ ὃν δ' ἂν πέσῃ λικμήσει αὐτόν — Θ, 1079, 1546
entire verse omitted by 𝔓^{104}, D, 33, it^{a,b,d,e,ff^{1}, ff^{2},r^{1}} syr^{s} Diatessaron^{syr} Irenaeus^{lat}, Origen, Eusebius^{syr}

4 Textual variants in Matthew 22

Matthew 22:10

γαμος (wedding) — B^{1} D W Θ 33 085 0161 ƒ^{1} ƒ^{13} 𝔐/Byz Irenaeus^{lat}
νυμφων (bride) — א B* L 0138 892 1010 𝑙^{102}
αγαμος (unmarried person) — C

Matthew 22:13

δησαντες αυτου χειρας και ποδας αρατε αυτον και εκβαλετε — M 043 565 1241
δησαντες αυτου ποδας και χειρας αρατε αυτον και εκβαλετε — E 1241
δησαντες αυτου ποδας και χειρας εκβαλετε — f^{1}
δησαντες αυτου ποδας και χειρας βαλετε — f^{13}

Matthew 22:30

γαμιζονται — א B D f^{1} 892 1010 1424
εκγαμιζονται — L 0138 0161 0197 Byz
γαμισκονται — W Θ f^{13} 33 700 pc

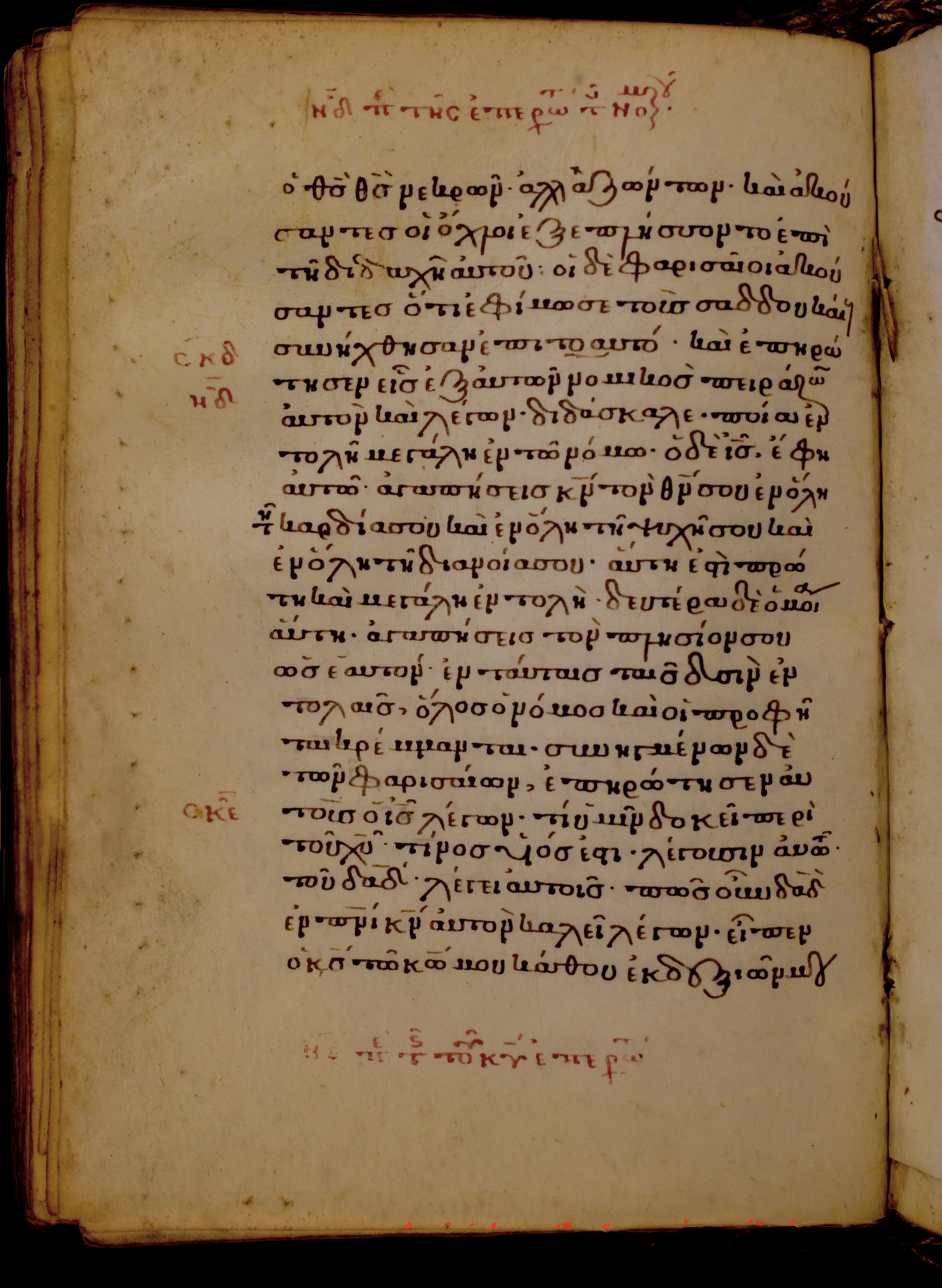
Matthew 22:32-44 from codex 544

Matthew 22:46

ημερας — majority
ωρας — D W f^{13} pc q syr^{s.c} cop^{bo}

2 Textual variants in Matthew 23

Matthew 23:26

καὶ τῆς παροψίδος (and dish) — א, B, C, L, W, 33, syr^{p, h}) 𝔐 cop ƒ^{13}
phrase omitted — D Q 1 118 209 1582 700 a d e ff^{1} r^{1} syr^{s}) geo Irenaeus^{lat} Clement (hiatus: b syr^{cur})

Matthew 23:38

ἔρημος — mss of the Western, Caesarean, Byzantine and some of Alexandrian text-types
word omitted — 𝔓^{77} (?), B, L, 𝑙^{184}

4 Textual variants in Matthew 24

Matthew 24:7

λιμοι και σεισμοι — B D 892 pc it syr^{s} cop^{sa}
λιμοι και λοιμοι και σεισμοι — C Θ 0138 f^{1} f^{13} (565) Byz h q syr^{p.h} mae
λοιμοι και λιμοι και σεισμοι — L W 33 pc lat

Matthew 24:9/24:10

εις θλιψιν — add. by א
εις θανατον — add. by Φ pc

Matthew 24:31

αρχομενων δε τουτων γινεσθαι αναβλεψατε και επαρατε τας κεφαλας υμων, διοτι εγγιζει η απολυτρωσις υμων — add. by D 1093 it

Matthew 24:41

δυο επι κλινης μιας εις παραλαμβανεται και εις αφιεται — D f^{13} pc it vg^{s}

3 Textual variants in Matthew 25

Matthew 25:1

του νυμφιου — א B K L W X^{2} Δ Π f^{13} 28 33 565 700 892^{mg} 1009 1010 1071 1079 1195^{c} 1216 1230 1241 1242^{c} 1253 1344 1365 1546 1646 2148 2174 Byz Lect
τω νυμφιω — C
των νυμφιων — 892*
του νυμφιου και της νυμφης — D X Θ Σ f^{1} 124* 174 1195^{vid} latt syr^{s,p,h**} mae-1 arm geo^{mss} Diatessaron^{mss} Origen Basil

Matthew 25:17

ἐκέρδησεν — א, B, C*, L, 33, 892, 1010, 1546, it^{aur, g^{1}, l}, vg, syr^{p, pal}, cop^{sa, bo}, arm, eth
καὶ αὐτὸς ἐκέρδησεν — D it^{d}
ἐκέδησεν καὶ αὐτός — A, C^{3}, K, W, X, Δ, Θ, Π, 074 ƒ^{1} ƒ^{13}, 28, 565, 700, 1009, 1071, 1079, 1195, 1216, 1230, 1241, 1242, 1253, 1344, 1365, 1646, 2174, 𝔐 Lect it^{h}, syr^{h}

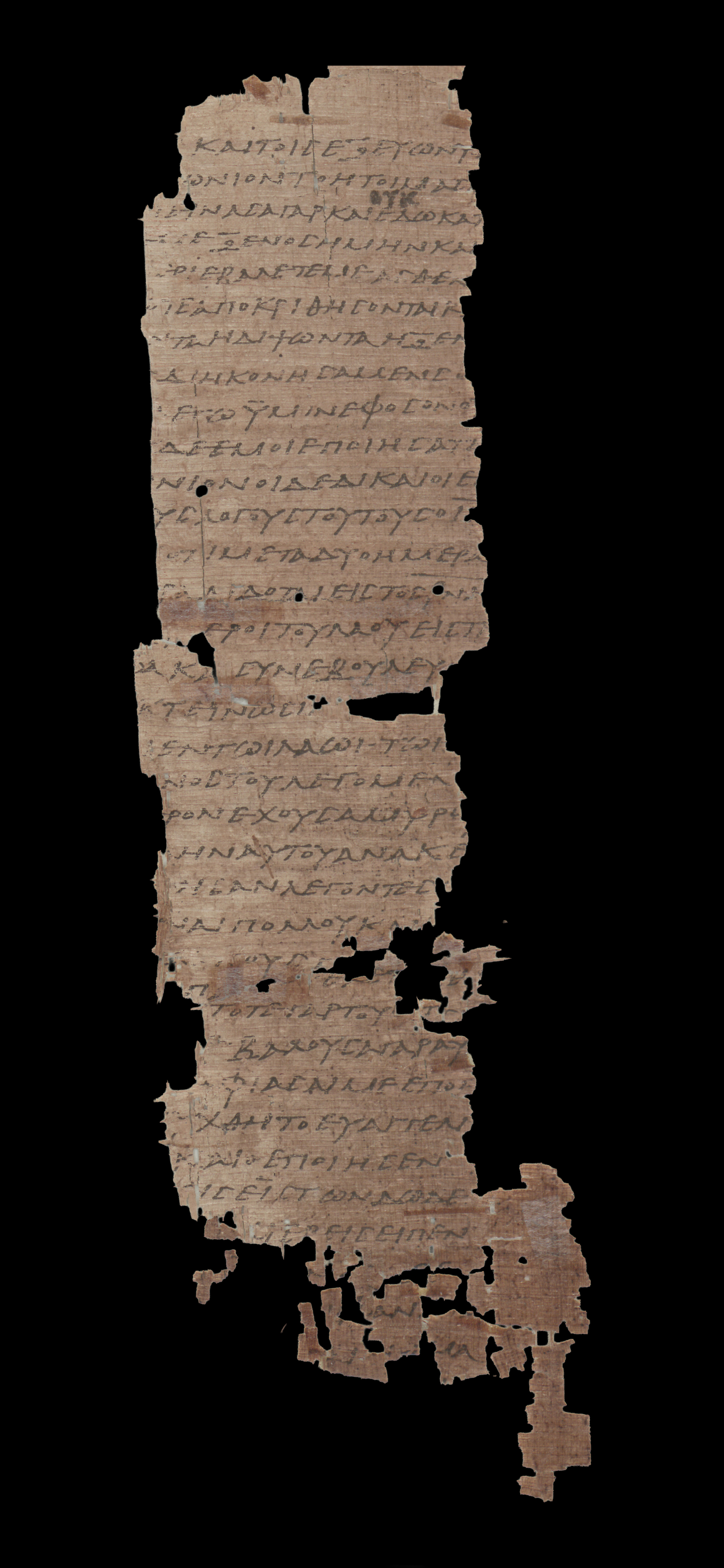
Matthew 25:41-46 from Papyrus 45

Matthew 25:41

το ητοιμασμενον (which has been prepared) — 𝔓^{45} א B K L W Δ Θ Π 067 074 0128 0136 f^{13} 28 33 565 700 892 1010 1071 1079 1195 1216 1230 1241 1242 1253 1365 1546 1646 2148 2174 Byz Lect
τῷ ἡτοιμασμένον (that has been prepared) F
τω ητοιμασμενω (that has been prepared) — 1009 1344 ℓ 1663
ο ητοιμασεν ο πατηρ μου (which my Father prepared) — D f^{1} it^{mss} Justin Martyr Irenaeus^{lat} Origen Cyprian
ο ητοιμασεν ο κυριος (which the Lord prepared) — Clement Tertullian

7 Textual variants in Matthew 26

Matthew 26:3

οι αρχιερεις — 𝔓^{45} א A B D L Θ 089, f^{1}, f^{13}, 565 700 892 1424 al lat syr^{s} cop
οι αρχιερεις και οι γραμματεις — 0133, 0255, Byz it syr^{p.h}
οι αρχιερεις και οι Φαρισαιοι — W

Matthew 26:7

βαρυτιμου – B, W, 089, 0133, 0255, f^{1}, f^{13}, Byz, syr^{h}
πολυτιμου – א, A, D, L, Θ, 33, 700, 892, 1010, 1424

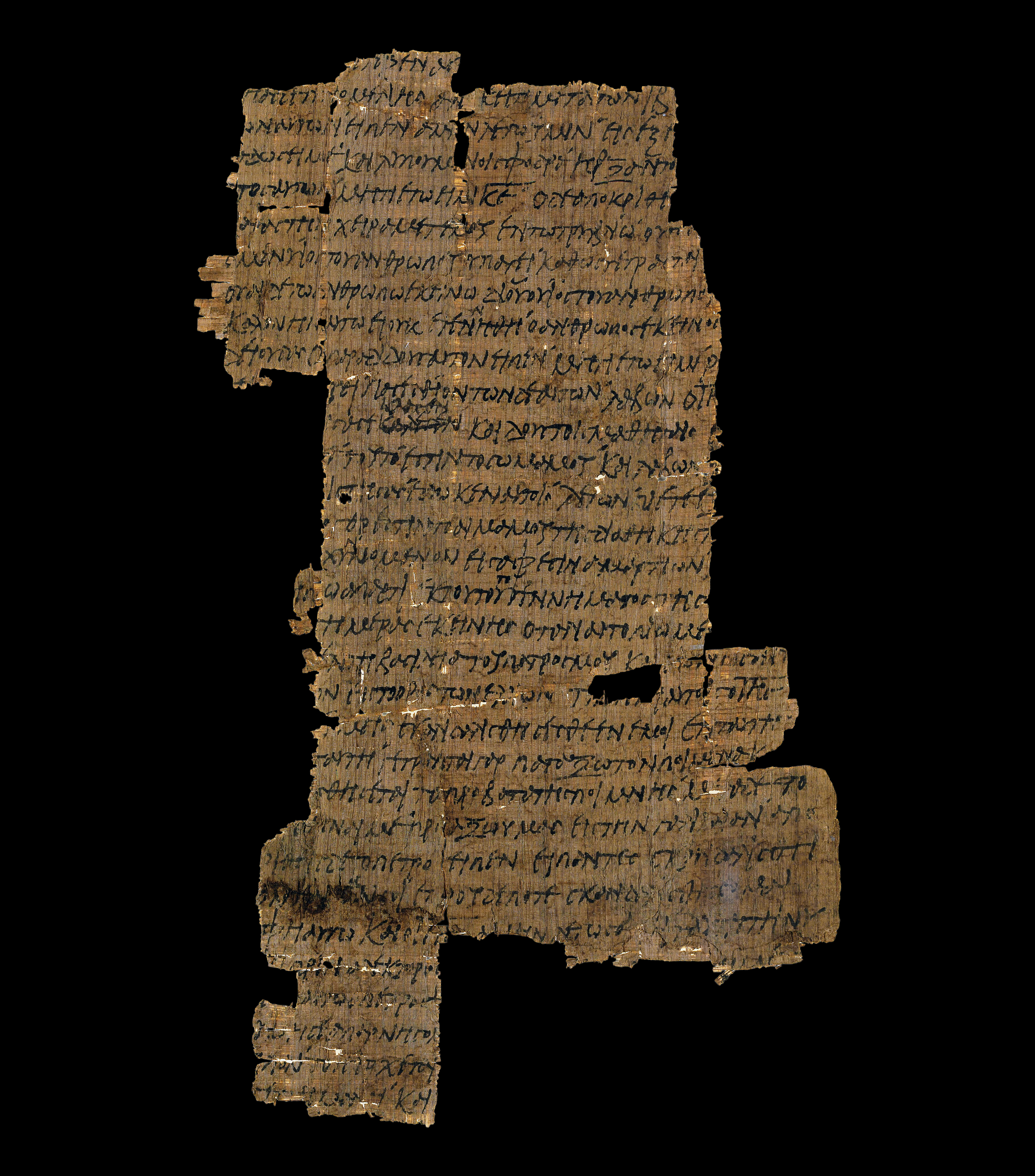
Papyrus 37 recto; fragment Mt 26:19-37, in 26:28 it has variant covenant

Matthew 26:28

τῆς καινῆς διαθήκης (the new covenant) A C D K W Π Δ f^{1} f^{13} Byz latt syr co^{sa, bo} Irenaeus^{lat}
τῆς διαθήκης (the covenant) 𝔓^{37} 𝔓^{45}^{vid} א B L Z Θ 0298^{vid} 33 mae-1 co^{bo^{ms}} Irenaeus^{arm}

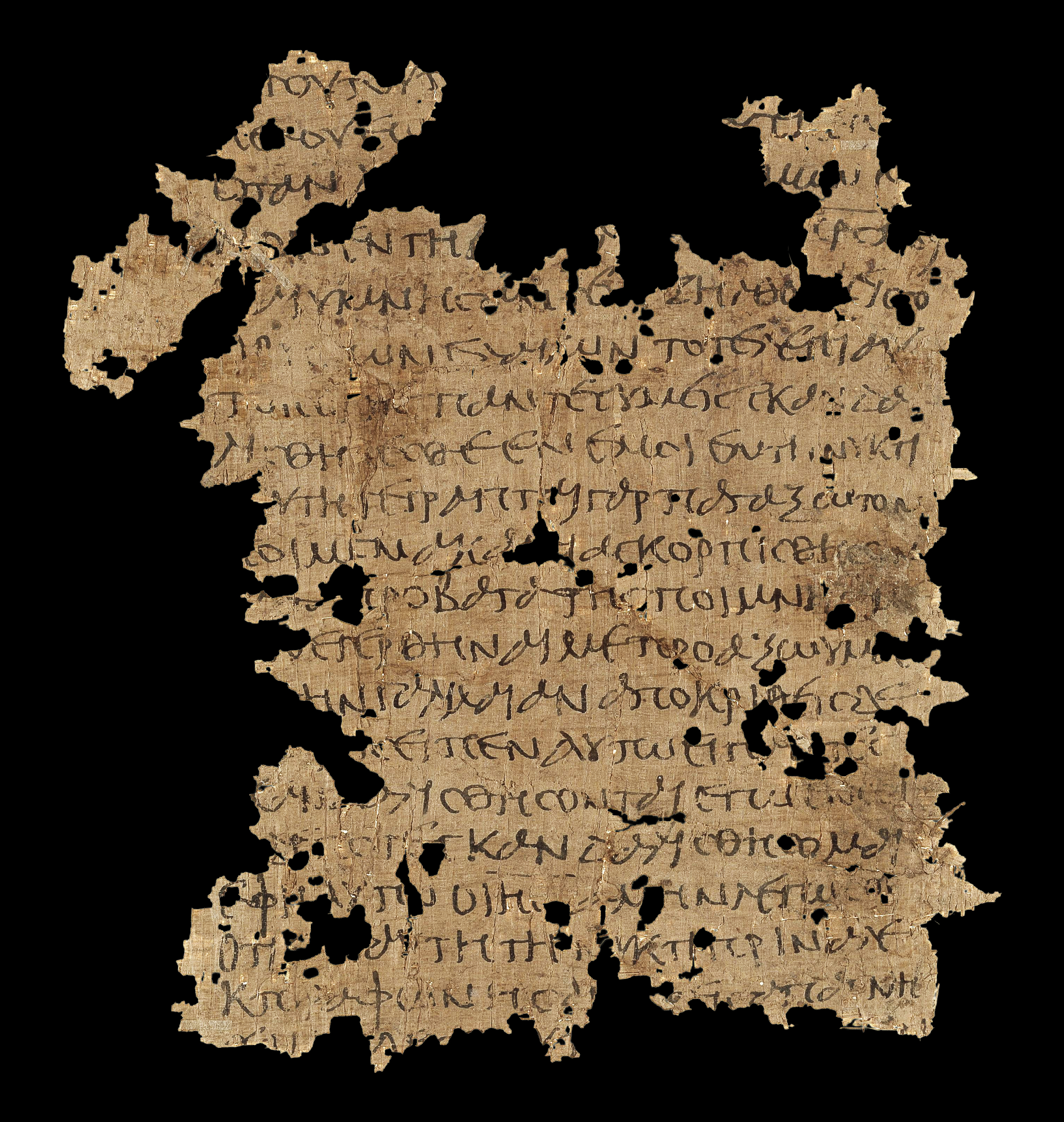
Matthew 26:29-35 from Papyrus 53

Matthew 26:29

πινω – majority of mss.
πιω – 𝔓^{37} D Θ 565

Matthew 26:44

omits text ἐκ τρίτου (out a third time) with 𝔓^{37} A K Π f^{1} 157 565 652 1424 it^{a,b,d,ff^{2},r^{1}}

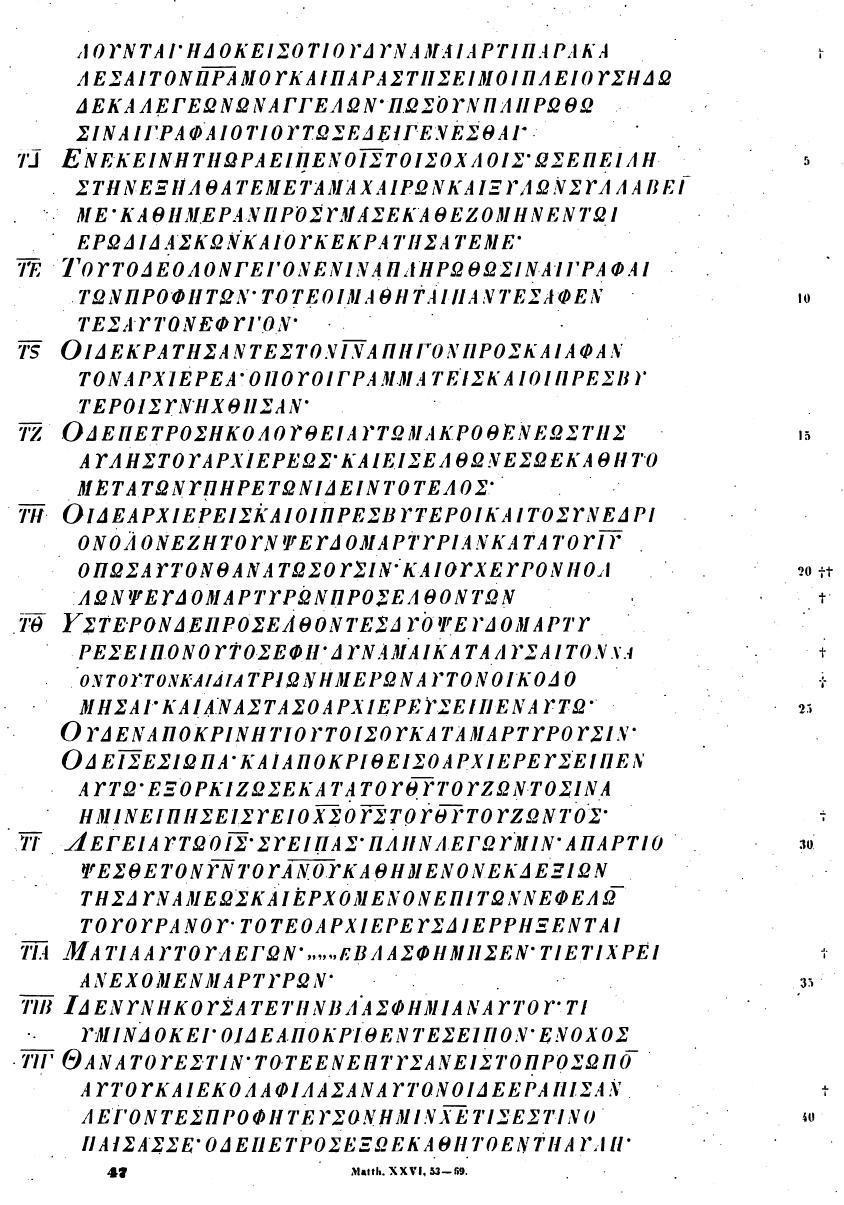
Matthew 26:52-69 from Codex Ephraemi in Tischendorf's facsimile (1843)

Matthew 26:60

ψευδομάρτυρες (false witnesses) (A) C D N W f^{13} 33 1241 Byz latt syr^{(s),h}
omit text — א B L Θ f^{1} syr^{p} co

Matthew 26:71 reads εἶδεν αὐτὸν ἄλλη παιδίσκη (another maidservant saw him) with it^{mss} vg^{mss}

13 Textual variants in Matthew 27

Matthew 27:4

ἀθῷον (innocent) — א B* C K W X Δ Π 𝔐/Byz Lect
δίκαιον (righteous) — B^{2mg} L Θ

Matthew 27:9

ἐπληρώθη τὸ ῥηθὲν διὰ Ἰερεμίου τοῦ προφήτου (fulfilled what was spoken by Jeremiah the prophet) — omitted word Ιερεμιου (Jeremiah) in manuscripts Φ 33 it^{a} it^{b} syr^{s, p} cop^{bo}
ἐπληρώθη τὸ ῥηθὲν διὰ Ζαχαρίου τοῦ προφήτου (fulfilled what was spoken by Zachariah the prophet) — 22 syr^{hmg}
ἐπληρώθη τὸ ῥηθὲν διὰ Ἰησαίου τοῦ προφήτου (fulfilled what was spoken by Isaiah the prophet) — 21

Matthew 27:16

Ἰησοῦν τὸν Βαραββᾶν (Jesus the Barabbas) — Θ ƒ^{1} 700* syr^{s, pal} arm geo^{2}
τὸν Βαραββᾶν (the Barabbas) — B 1010 Origen Jerome ("Barabbas, or Bar Rabbah, which is interpreted as the son of their master)
Βαραββᾶν (Barabbas) — א A D K L W Δ Π 064 f^{13} 565 700^{c} 892 1009 1071 1079 1195 1216 1230 1241 1242 1253 1344 1365 1546 1646 2148 2174 𝔐/Byz Lect cop^{sa,bo} goth

Matthew 27:17

Ἰησοῦν τὸν Βαραββᾶν (Jesus, the son of their rabban) (Θ) f^{1} 22* (700*) syr^{s,pal^{mss}} arm geo^{mss} Origen^{pt} and Origen^{mss}
τὸν Βαραββᾶν (the son of their rabban) B 1010 Origen^{pt}
Βαραββᾶν (Barabbas) א A D L W f^{13} 33 Byz latt syr^{p,h} co Origen^{mss}

Matthew 27:21

τὸν Βαραββᾶν (the son of their rabban) א B L Θ f^{1} 33 892*
Βαραββᾶν (Barabbas) A D W f^{13} Byz

Matthew 27:24

κατέναντι (in the sight of) B D 0281
ἀπέναντι (amidst) א A L W Θ f^{1} f^{13} 33 Byz

Matthew 27:28

εκδυσαντες αυτον (upon undressing him) — א Α K L W Δ Θ Π 0250 'f^{1} 'f^{13} 565 700 892 1009 1010 1071 1079 1216 1230 1241 1242 1253 1344 1365 1546 1646 2148 2174 Byz Lect aur ff^{1} g1 l vg syr cop arm geo
ενδυσαντες αυτον (upon clothing him) — א^{1} B D 157 1424 it^{mss} vg^{mss} syr^{s} eth Origen Diatessaron
εκδυσαντες αυτον τα ιματια αυτου — 064 33 1195
ενδυσαντες αυτον ιματιον πορφυρουν και — D it

Matthew 27:41

τῶν γραμματέων καὶ Φαρισαίων (the scribes and Pharisees) D W 517 1424 it^{a,b,c,d,ff^{2},g^{1},h,q,r^{1}} syr^{s}
τῶν γραμματέων καὶ πρεσβυτέρων (the scribes and elders) א A B L Θ f^{1} f^{13} 33 652 700 892 it^{aur,ff^{1},g^{1},l} vg co^{sa^{mss}},bo^{mss} mae-1 Codex Schøyen
τῶν γραμματέων καὶ πρεσβυτέρων καὶ Φαρισαίων (the scribes and elders and Pharisees) Y Δ Π Σ Φ 22 157 565 Byz it^{f} syr^{p,h} co^{bo^{mss}}
omit text — Γ

Matthew 27:46

λαμὰ ζαφθανι {"lamah zaphthani"} (Why have you forsaken me?) D* it^{mss}
λαμα σαβαχθανί {"lama sabachthani"} (Why have you forsaken me?) Θ f^{1} vg^{mss} mae-1
λιμὰ σαβαχθανί {"lima sabachthani"} (Why have you forsaken me?) A (W) f^{13} Byz it^{mss}
λεμα σαβακτανεί {"lema sabaktanei"} (Why have you forsaken me?) B (892) it^{mss} vg^{mss} co^{bo^{mss}}
λεμα σαβαχθανι {"lema sabachthani"} (Why have you forsaken me?) א L 33 700 it^{ms}

Matthew 27:49 (see John 19:34)

Ηλιας σωσων αυτον αλλος δε λαβων λογχην ενυξεν αυτου την πλευραν και εξηλθεν υδωρ και αιμα (Elijah will save him. Then another, upon taking a spear, pierced his side, and out came water and blood.) — א B C (L) U 5 26 175 871 1010 1011 1057 1293 1300 1416 1566 1701 2126 2585 2622 2766* vg^{mss} syr^{pal^{mss}} cop^{mae-1} eth^{ms} slav Chrysostom^{per Severus} Cyril^{per Severus}
Ηλιας σωσων αυτον αλλος δε λαβων λογχην ενυξεν αυτου την πλευραν και εξηλθεν αιμα και υδωρ (Elijah will save him. Then another, upon taking a spear, pierced his side, and out came blood and water.) — U (Γ) 48 67 115 127 160 364 782 1392 1448 1555 1780 2117 2139 2283 2328 2437* 2586 2680 2787 vg^{ms} Codex Schøyen arab^{ms}
Ηλιας σωσων αυτον (Elijah will save him.) — A D E F G H K M S W Y Δ Θ Π Σ Ω 090 f^{1} f^{13} 1 2 22 28 33 35 69 118 124 157 180 205 346 372 565 579 597 700 788 892 1005 1006 1009 1071 1079 1195 1216 1230 1241 1242 1243 1253 1292 1342 1344 1365 1424 1505 1546 1582 1646 2148 2174 2358 2372 2737 𝔐 Lect lat syr^{s,p,h,pal^{mss}} cop^{sa,bo} goth arm eth^{mss} geo Diatessaron Origen Eusebius Apostolic Canons Hilary Jerome Augustine Hesychius

Matthew 27:56

Ἰωσὴφ (of Joseph) – Westcott and Hort 1881, Westcott and Hort / [NA27 and UBS4 variants], Tischendorf's 8th Edition 1864–94, Nestle 1904
Ἰωσῆ (of Joses) – Stephanus Textus Receptus 1550, Scrivener's Textus Receptus 1894, RP Byzantine Majority Text 2005, Greek Orthodox Church

Matthew 27:65

Ἔχετε φυλακὰς (You have watchmen) D* it^{mss} vg^{ms} co^{bo} mae-1
Ἔχετε κουστωδίαν (You have a watch) rell

Matthew 27:66

τῶν φυλακων (their watchmen) D* it^{mss} vg^{mss} co^{bo^{mss}} mae-1
τῆς κουστωδίας (their watch) rell

6 Textual variants in Matthew 28

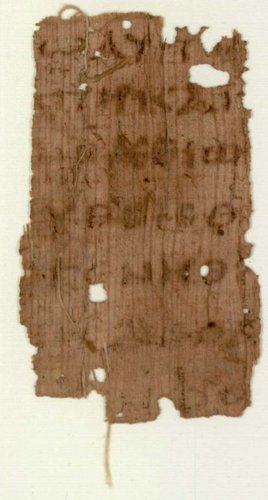
Matthew 28:2-5 from Papyrus 105 (verso)

Matthew 28:2

ἀπεκύλισεν τὸν λίθον (rolled away the stone) א B D 700 892 it^{mss} vg syr^{s} co^{sa}
ἀπεκύλισεν τὸν λίθον ἀπὸ τῆς θύρας (rolled away the stone from the opening) A C K W Δ 579 1424 Byz^{mss} it^{mss} syr^{p}
ἀπεκύλισεν τὸν λίθον ἀπὸ τῆς θύρας τοῦ μνημείου (rolled away the stone from the opening of the tomb) L Γ Θ f^{1} f^{13} 22 33 157 565 1241 Byz^{mss} syr^{h,pal} co^{bo} mae-1 Codex Schøyen Eusebius

Matthew 28:6

τὸν τόπον ὅπου ἔκειτο ὁ κύριος (the place where the Lord was positioned) A C D L W Δ 0148 f^{1} f^{13} 652 Byz it^{mss} vg syr^{(p),h,pal}
τὸν τόπον ὅπου ἔκειτο (the place where he was positioned) א B Θ 33 892* it^{e} syr^{s} co Codex Schøyen
τὸν τόπον ὅπου ἔκειτο τὸ σῶμα τοῦ κυρίου (the place where was positioned the body of the Lord) 1424
τὸν τόπον ὅπου ἔκειτο ὁ Ἰησοῦς (the place where Jesus was positioned) Φ

Matthew 28:7

omits text ἀπὸ τῶν νεκρῶν (from the dead) with 565 it^{a,b,d,e,ff^{1},g^{1},h,l,r^{1}} vg syr^{s} arm Origen

Matthew 28:9

Ὡς δὲ ἐπορεύοντο ἀπαγγεῖλαι τοῖς μαθηταῖς αὐτοῦ (But as they were going to address his disciples) opens verse in A C L Δ Σ Φ 0148 f^{1} (1424) Byz it^{f,(q)} syr^{h}
text omitted — א B D W Θ f^{13} 13 33 69 279 700 788 892 1292 2680 it^{mss} vg syr^{p} co Codex Schøyen Origen Eusebius Cyril

Matthew 28:18

ἐν οὐρανοῖς (in the heavens) D
ἐν οὐρανῷ (in heaven) rell

Matthew 28:19

Πορευθέντες οὖν (omit οὖν in א A ƒ^{13} 𝔐/Byz) μαθητεύσατε πάντα τὰ ἔθνη βαπτίζοντες (—σαντες in B D) αὐτοὺς εἰς τὸ ὄνομα τοῦ πατρὸς καὶ τοῦ υἱοῦ καὶ τοῦ ἁγίου πνεύματος (Go therefore, make disciples of all the nations, baptizing them into the name of the father and of the son and of the holy spirit) א A B D W ƒ^{1,13} 𝔐/Byz latt syr co rell
Πορευθέντες μαθητεύσατε πάντα τὰ ἔθνη ἐν τῷ ὀνόματί μου (Go make disciples of all the nations in my name) Eusebius^{Ante-Nicene}

Compare with Acts 2:38, Acts 10:48, Acts 19:5, Romans 6:3, 1 Corinthians 1:13

== Gospel of Mark ==
17 Textual variants in Mark 1

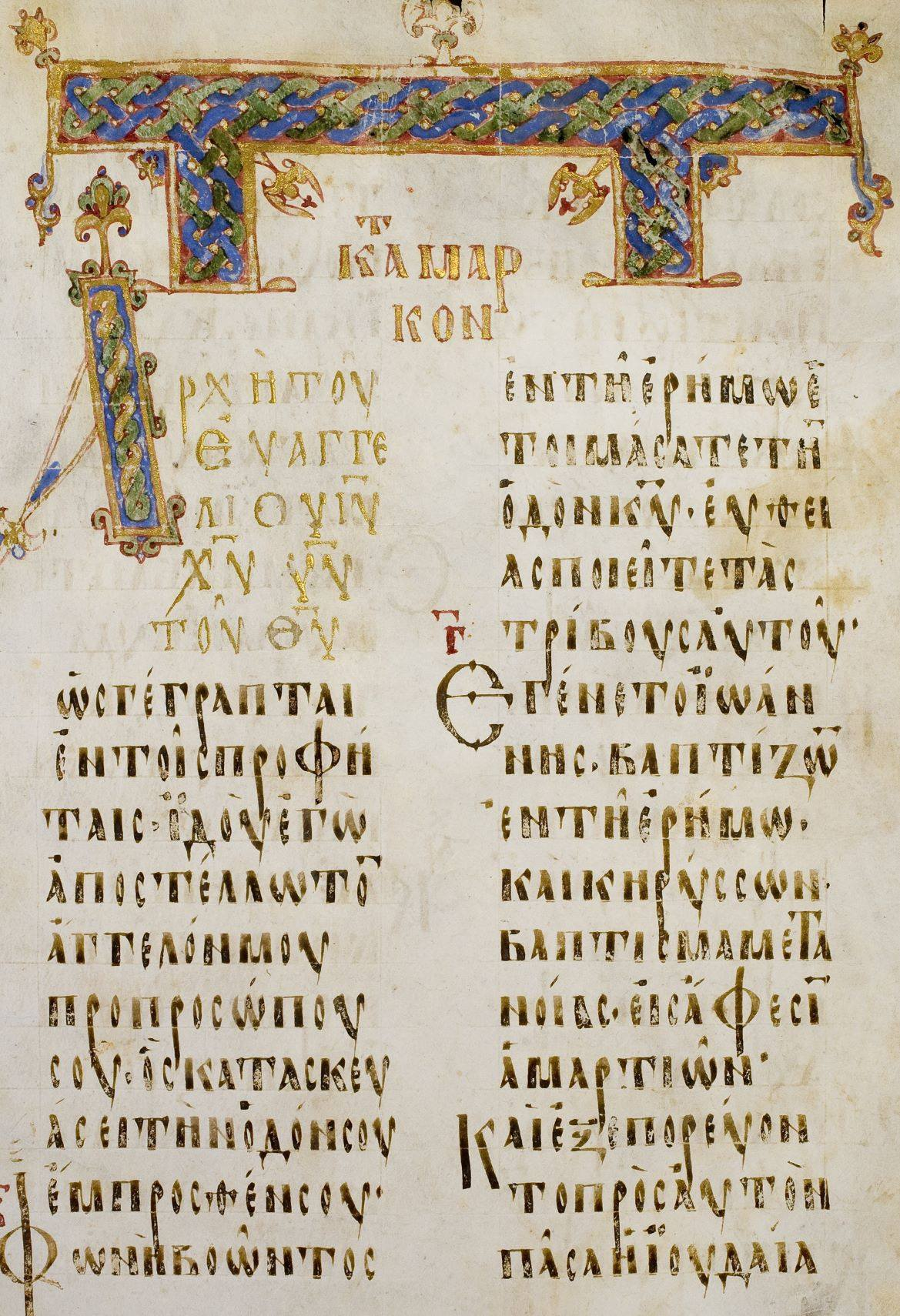
Codex Boreelianus, Mark 1:1-5a

Mark 1:1

Ἰησοῦ Χριστοῦ (of Jesus Christ) – א* Θ 28^{c} 530 582* 820* 1021 1436 1555* 1692 2430 2533 l^{2211} cop^{sa(ms)} arm geo^{1} Origen^{gr} Origen^{lat} Victorinus-Pettau Asterius Serapion Titus-Bostra Basil Cyril-Jerusalem Severian Jerome^{3/6} Hesychius WH^{text} Riv^{mg} NM
Ἰησοῦ Χριστοῦ υἱοῦ θεοῦ (of Jesus Christ son of God) – א^{1} B D L W 732 1602 2427 Diatessaron^{p} WH^{mg} (NA [υἱοῦ θεοῦ])
Ἰησοῦ Χριστοῦ υἱοῦ τοῦ θεοῦ (of Jesus Christ son of the God) – A E F G^{supp} H K Δ Π Σ ƒ^{1} ƒ^{13} 33 180 205 565 579 597 700 892 1006 1009 1010 1071 1079 1195 1216 1230 1242 1243 1253 1292 1342 1344 1365 1424 1505 1546 1646 2148 2174 Byz Lect eth geo^{2} slav ς
Ἰησοῦ Χριστοῦ τοῦ θεοῦ (of Jesus Christ of the God) – 055 pc
τοῦ κυρίου Ἰησοῦ Χριστοῦ (of the lord Jesus Christ) – syr^{pal}
Ἰησοῦ Χριστοῦ υἱοῦ τοῦ κυρίου (of Jesus Christ son of the lord) – 1241
Ἰησοῦ (of Jesus) – 28*

Mark 1:2

καθὼς γέγραπται (Just as it is written) – Alexandrian text-type: Westcott and Hort 1881, Westcott and Hort / [NA27 and UBS4 variants] 1864–94, Tischendorf 8th Edition, Nestle 1904
ὡς γέγραπται (As it is written) – ς Byz: Stephanus Textus Receptus 1550, Scrivener's Textus Receptus 1894, RP Byzantine Majority Text 2005, Greek Orthodox Church

Mark 1:2

ἐν τοῖς προφήταις (in the prophets) – A E F G H K P W Π Σ ƒ^{13} 28 180 579 597 1006 1009 1010 1079 1195 1216 1230 1242 1253 1292 1342 1344 1365 1424 1505 1546 1646 Byz Lect vg^{ms} syr^{h} cop^{bo(ms)(mg)} arm eth slav Irenaeus^{lat2/3} Asterius Photius Theophylact ς ND Dio. Byz: Stephanus Textus Receptus 1550, Scrivener's Textus Receptus 1894, RP Byzantine Majority Text 2005, Greek Orthodox Church
ἐν τῷ Ἠσαἲᾳ τῷ προφήτῃ (in the Isaiah the prophet) – א B L D 22 33 565 892 1241 2427 Origen^{1/4}. Alexandrian text-type: Westcott and Hort 1881, Westcott and Hort / [NA27 and UBS4 variants] 1864–94, Tischendorf 8th Edition, Nestle 1904
ἐν Ἠσαἲᾳ τῷ προφήτῃ (in Isaiah the prophet) – D Θ ƒ^{1} 205 372 700 1071 1243 2174 2737 pc l^{253} arm geo Irenaeus^{gr} Origen^{3/4} Severian (Jerome) Augustine Hesychius Victor-Antioch
ἐν τῷ Ἠσαΐᾳ τῷ προφήτῃ or ἐν Ἠσαΐᾳ τῷ προφήτῃ (in (the) Isaiah the prophet) – it^{a} it^{aur} it^{b} it^{c} it^{d} it^{f} it^{ff2} it^{l} it^{q} vg syr^{p} syr^{h(mg)} syr^{pal} cop^{sa} cop^{bo} goth Irenaeus^{lat1/3} Irenaeus^{lat} NR CEI Riv TILC Nv NM
ἐν Ἠσαΐᾳ (in Isaiah) – Victorinus-Pettau Ambrosiaster Serapion Titus-Bostra Basil Epiphanius Chromatius
ἐν Ἠσαΐᾳ καὶ ἐν τοῖς προφήταις (in Isaiah and in the prophets) – it^{r1(vid)}

Mark 1:2

Ἰδοὺ (Behold...) – B D Θ 28* 565 pc it vg cop Irenaeus^{lat}. Alexandrian text-type: Westcott and Hort 1881, Westcott and Hort / [NA27 and UBS4 variants] 1864–94, Nestle 1904
Ἰδού, ἐγὼ (Behold, I...) – א A L W ƒ^{1} ƒ^{13} Byz vg^{st} vg^{cl} syr^{h} cop^{sa(ms)} cop^{bo(ms)} Origen Eusebius ς. Tischendorf 8th Edition. Byz: Stephanus Textus Receptus 1550, Scrivener's Textus Receptus 1894, RP Byzantine Majority Text 2005, Greek Orthodox Church

Mark 1:2

τὴν ὁδόν σου· (the way of you:) – א B D K L P W Θ Π Φ 700* 2427 2766 al it vg syr^{p} cop^{pt} Irenaeus^{lat} WH NR CEI Riv TILC Nv NM. Alexandrian text-type: Westcott and Hort 1881, Westcott and Hort / [NA27 and UBS4 variants] 1864–94, Tischendorf 8th Edition, Nestle 1904
τὴν ὁδόν σου ἔμπροσθέν σου. (the way of you before you.) – A Δ ƒ^{1} ƒ^{13} 33 565 1342 Byz it^{f} it^{ff2} it^{l} vg^{cl} syr^{h} cop^{sa(mss)} cop^{bo(pt)} goth Origen Eusebius ς ND Dio. Byz: Stephanus Textus Receptus 1550, Scrivener's Textus Receptus 1894, RP Byzantine Majority Text 2005, Greek Orthodox Church

Mark 1:4

ὁ βαπτίζων ἐν τῇ ἐρήμῳ καὶ (the Baptist in the wilderness and) – א L Δ 205 1342 cop^{bo} geo^{1} slav^{ms} (NA [ὁ]) TILC
ὁ βαπτίζων ἐν τῇ ἐρήμῳ (the Baptist in the wilderness) – B 33 2427 pc cop^{bo(mss)} WH NR Riv Nv NM
βαπτίζων ἐν τῇ ἐρήμῳ καὶ (baptising in the wilderness and) – A E F G H K P^{vid} W Π Σ ƒ^{1} ƒ^{13} 180 565 579 1006 1009 1010 1071 1079 1195 1216 1230 1241 1242 1243 1253 1292 1344 1365 1424 1505 1546 1646 2148 2174 Byz Lect (l^{751}) (l^{1074}) it^{f} syr^{h} syr^{pal} (cop^{sa} omitted καὶ) goth arm eth slav^{mss} ς (CEI) (Dio)
βαπτίζων ἐν τῇ ἐρήμῳ (baptising in the wilderness) – 892
ἐν τῇ ἐρήμῳ βαπτίζων καὶ (in the wilderness baptising and) – D Θ 28 700 l^{2211} it^{a} it^{aur} it^{b} it^{c} it^{ff1} it^{l} it^{q} it^{r1} it^{t} vg syr^{p} (Eusebius Cyril-Jerusalem omitted καὶ) Jerome Augustine ND
ἐν τῇ ἐρήμῳ καὶ (in the wilderness and) – geo^{2}

Mark 1:5

πάντες, καὶ ἐβαπτίζοντο ὑπ' αὐτοῦ ἐν τῷ Ἰορδάνῃ ποταμῷ (all, and [they] were baptised by him in the Jordan river) – B D L 28 33 892 1241 pc it vg cop? Origen WH NR CEI Riv (TILC) (Nv) NM
πάντες, ἐβαπτίζοντο ὑπ' αὐτοῦ ἐν τῷ Ἰορδάνῃ ποταμῷ (all, [they] were baptised by him in the Jordan river) – א* pc
καὶ ἐβαπτίζοντο πάντες ἐν τῷ Ἰορδάνῃ ποταμῷ ὑπ' αὐτοῦ (and [they] were baptised all in the Jordan river by him) – A W ƒ^{1} 700 Byz syr^{h} ς ND Dio
καὶ πάντες ἐβαπτίζοντο ἐν τῷ Ἰορδάνῃ ποταμῷ ὑπ' αὐτοῦ (and all were baptised in the Jordan river by him) – ƒ^{13} 565 pc
καὶ ἐβαπτίζοντο ἐν τῷ Ἰορδάνῃ ποταμῷ ὑπ' αὐτοῦ (and [they] were baptised in the Jordan river by him) – Θ pc

Mark 1:5

ποταμῷ ([in the] river) – Byz ς WH
omitted – D W Θ 28 565 799 it^{a} Eusebius

Mark 1:6

καὶ ζώνην δερματίνην περὶ τὴν ὀσφὺν αὐτοῦ (and a belt of leather around the waist of him) – Byz it^{aur} it^{c} it^{f} it^{l} it^{q} vg ς WH
omitted – D it^{a} it^{b} it^{d} it^{ff2} it^{r1} it^{t} vg^{ms}

Mark 1:7

ὀπίσω μου (after me) – Byz ς [WH]
ὀπίσω (after) – B Origen
omitted – Δ 1424 it^{t} it^{ff2}

Mark 1:7

κύψας (having stooped down) – Byz ς WH
omitted – D Θ ƒ^{13} 28* 565 pc it

Mark 1:8

ἐγὼ (I) – WH. Alexandrian text-type: Westcott and Hort 1881, Westcott and Hort / [NA27 and UBS4 variants] 1864–94, Tischendorf 8th Edition, Nestle 1904
ἐγὼ μέν (I indeed) – Byz ς. Byz: Stephanus Textus Receptus 1550, Scrivener's Textus Receptus 1894, RP Byzantine Majority Text 2005, Greek Orthodox Church

Mark 1:8

ὕδατι ([with] water) – א B H Δ 33 892* 1006 1216 1243 1342 2427 vg arm geo Origen Jerome Augustine WH. Alexandrian text-type: Westcott and Hort 1881, Westcott and Hort / [NA27 and UBS4 variants] 1864–94, Tischendorf 8th Edition, Nestle 1904
ἐν ὕδατι (in water) – A E F G K L P W (Θ μέν before ἐν) Π Σ ƒ^{1} ƒ^{13} 28 157 180 205 565 579 700 892c 1009 1010 1071 1079 1195 1230 1241 1242 1253 1292 1344 1365 1424 1505 1546 1646 2148 2174 Byz Lect it^{aur} it^{b} it^{c} it^{f} it^{l} it^{q} it^{t} vg^{mss} cop^{sa} cop^{bo} goth eth Hippolytus ς. Byz: Stephanus Textus Receptus 1550, Scrivener's Textus Receptus 1894, RP Byzantine Majority Text 2005, Greek Orthodox Church. Compare Matthew 3:11; John 1:26.

ἐν ὕδατι (in water) inserted after λέγων in Mark 1:7 – D it^{a} it^{d} it^{ff2} it^{r1}

Mark 1:8

π̣̅ν̣̅ι̅ αγ̣[ιω] (the Holy Spirit) – 𝔓^{137}. π̣̅ν̣̅ι̅ is a nomen sacrum abbreviation of πν(ευματ)ι, see Papyrus 137 § Particular readings.
πνεύματι ἁγίῳ (the Holy Spirit) – B L it^{aur} it^{b} it^{t} vg syr^{p?} syr^{h?} syr^{pal?} arm geo Augustine WH
ἐν πνεύματι ἁγίῳ (with the Holy Spirit) – א A D K W Δ Θ Π 0133 ƒ^{1} ƒ^{13} 8 33 565 700 892 1009 1010 1071 1079 1216 1230 1242 1253 1344 1365 1546 1646 2148 2174 Byz Lect^{m} (it^{a}) it^{c} it^{d} it^{f} it^{ff2} it^{l} it^{q} (it^{r1}) cop^{sa} cop^{bo} syr^{p?} syr^{h?} syr^{pal?} goth eth Hippolytus Origen ς. Compare Matthew 3:12; Luke 3:16.
ἐν πνεύματι ἁγίῳ καὶ πυρί (with the Holy Spirit and fire) – P 1195 1241 ℓ 44m syr^{h*}. Compare Matthew 3:12; Luke 3:16.

Mark 1:13

καὶ ἦν ἐν τῇ ερημω (he was in the wilderness) – א A B D L Θ 33. 579. 892. 1342.
καὶ ἦν ἐκει ἐν τῇ ερημω (he was there in the wilderness) – W Δ 157. 1241. Byz
καὶ ἦν ἐκει (he was there) – 28. 517. 565. 700. ƒ^{1} Family Π syr^{s}
Omit – ƒ^{13}
Hiatus – C Ψ syr^{c}

Mark 1:14

εὐαγγέλιον – א B L Θ ƒ^{1} ƒ^{13} 28. 33. 565. 892
εὐαγγέλιον τῆς βασιλείας – Α, D Κ, W Δ Π 074 0133 0135 28^{mg}, 700. 1009. 1010. 1071. 1079. 1195. 1216. 1230. 1241. 1242. 1253. 1344. 1365. 1546. 1646. 2148. 2174. Byz, Lect, lat, syr^{p}, cop^{bo}

Mark 1:41

σπλαγχνισθεις (filled with compassion) – All manuscripts except those listed below
οργισθεις (irritated; angry) – D a ff^{2} r^{1}

2 Textual variants in Mark 2

Mark 2:16

ἐσθίει (eating) - B D W it^{a, b, d, e, ff^{2}, r^{1}}, u[w]
ἐσθίει καὶ πίνει (eating and drinking) - 𝔓^{88} A ƒ^{1} ƒ^{13} 2. 28. 33. 157. 180. 597. 892. 1006. 1010. 1292. 1505. $\mathfrak{M}$ / Byz E F H Lect it^{q}, vg^{ms}, syr^{p,h}, cop^{sa^{ms}}, [w]τ
ἐσθίεται (=ἐσθίετε?) (eating) - Θ
ἐσθίει ό διδάσκαλος ύμων (your teacher eating) - (see Mt 9:11) א 1342. it^{aur}, vg^{ms} (Origen^{lat}), DHH
ἐσθίει καὶ πίνει ό διδάσκαλος ύμων (eating and drinking, your teacher) - L Δ ƒ^{13} 1071. 1243. 1346. it^{(c),f}, vg, cop^{bo}, Augustine
ἐσθίετε καὶ πίνετε ([are you] eating and drinking) - (see Lk 5:30) Σ 124. 565. 700. 1241. 1424. ℓ 547ℓ 866 sry^{pal}, arm, geo, Diatessaron
ἐσθίειτε καὶ πίνειτε ([are you] eating and drinking) - G
ό διδάσκαλος ύμων ἐσθίει καὶ πίνει (your teacher eating and drinking) - C 579 ℓ 890 it^{1}, cop^{sa^{mss}}, eth
ἐσθίετε ([are you] eating) - 1424.

Mark 2:26

ἐπὶ Ἀβιαθαρ ἀρχιερέως (when Abiatar was high priest) – א A B K L 892. 1010. 1195. 1216. 1230. 1242. 1344. 1365. 1646. 2174. Byz, ℓ 69 ℓ 70 ℓ 76 ℓ 80 ℓ 150 ℓ 299 ℓ 1127 ℓ 1634 ℓ 1761 arm
ἐπὶ Ἀβιαθαρ τοῦ ἀρχιερέως (when Abiatar was high priest) – A C Θ Π 074
ἐπὶ Ἀβιαθαρ τοῦ ἱερέως (when Abiatar was priest) – Δ it^{f}
phrase is omitted by manuscripts D W 1009. 1546. it^{a, b, d, e, ff^{2}, i, r^{1}, t}, syr^{s}

2 Textual variants in Mark 3

Mark 3:7

ἀπὸ τῆς Γαλιλαίας ἠκολούθησεν, καὶ ἀπὸ τῆς Ἰουδαίας - B L 565. 728.^{vid}
ἀπὸ τῆς Γαλιλαίας ἠκολούθησεν αὐτῷ, καὶ ἀπὸ τῆς Ἰουδαίας - 61.^{c} 427. 555.^{c} 732. 892. ℓ 950 Byz
ἀπὸ τῆς Γαλιλαίας ἠκολούθησαν αὐτῷ, καὶ ἀπὸ τῆς Ἰουδαίας - Φ^{vid} 0211 ƒ^{13:}^{(13. 346. 543. 826.)} 4. 23. 154. 179. 273. 349. 351. 372. 382. 513. 517. 544. 695. 716. 733. 752. 766. 780. 792. 803. 873. 954. 979. 1009. 1047. 1084. 1241. 1326. 1337. 1396. 1424. 1506. 1515. 1546. 1645. 1654. 1675. 2538. 2737. 2766. ℓ 211 ℓ 387 ℓ 770 ℓ 773 ℓ 2211 sy^{h}
ἀπὸ τῆς Γαλιλαίας καὶ ἀπὸ τῆς Ἰουδαίας ἠκολούθησαν - א C
ἀπὸ τῆς Γαλιλαίας καὶ ἀπὸ τῆς Ἰουδαίας ἠκολούθησαν αὐτῷ - Δ 377. 1071. 1342.
ἀπὸ τῆς Γαλιλαίας ἠκολούθησεν αὐτῷ, καὶ ἀπὸ Ἱεροσολύμων καὶ ἀπὸ τῆς Ἰουδαίας καὶ πέραν τοῦ Ἰορδάνου - ƒ^{1:}^{(1. 131. 205.)} 1253. (ἐκ τῆς Γαλιλαίας) 2193.* 2886.
καὶ ἀπὸ τῆς Ἰουδαίας καὶ πέραν τοῦ Ἰορδάνου ἀπὸ τῆς Γαλιλαίας ἠκολούθησεν αὐτῷ, καὶ ἀπὸ Ἱεροσολύμων - 118. 209. 1582.

Mark 3:14

δώδεκα, ἵνα ὦσιν μετʼ αὐτοῦ - C^{c2} L ƒ^{1:}^{(1. 205. 209. 1582.)} 33. 382. 427. 544. 565. 579. 732. 740. 792. 892. 1342. 1424. 2193. 2542. 2766. 2886. ℓ 950 Byz
ἵνα ὦσιν δώδεκα μετʼ αὐτοῦ - D 79.
δώδεκα, ἵνα ὦσιν περὶ αὐτὸν - 700.
δώδεκαμαθητας ἵνα ὦσιν μετʼ αὐτοῦ οὓς καὶ ἀποστόλους ὠνόμασεν - W
δώδεκα οὓς καὶ ἀποστόλους ὠνόμασεν ἵνα ὦσιν μετʼ αὐτοῦ - א B (ὁνόμασεν - Θ ƒ^{13:}^{(13. 124. 346. 543. 788. 826. 828. 1689.)} 69. 238. 377. 807. 983. 1160. sy^{h(ms)}
ἵνα ὦσιν μετʼ αὐτοῦ δώδεκα οὓς καὶ ἀποστόλους ὠνόμασεν - Δ
δώδεκα, ἵνα ὦσιν μετʼ αὐτοῦ και ἵνα ἀποστέλλει αὐτοὺς οὓς καὶ ἀποστόλους ὠνόμασεν - Φ^{vid}

3 Textual variants in Mark 4

Mark 4:19

η αγαπη του πλουτου (the love of wealth) – Δ
η απατη του πλουτου (the illusion of wealth) – א A B C E Byz
απαται του πλουτου (the illusions of wealth) – W
απαται του κοσμου (the illusions of world) – D (Θ 565.)

Mark 4:19

και αι περι τα λοιπα επιθυμιαι (and the desire for other things) – rest of mss
omit – D (Θ) W ƒ^{1} 28. (565. 700.) it

Mark 4:24

καὶ προστεθήσεται ὑμῖν – א B C L Δ 700. 892.
καὶ προστεθήσεται ὑμῖν τοῖς ἀκούουσιν – A K Π 0107 Byz
omit – codices D W 565.

3 Textual variants in Mark 5

Mark 5:9

απεκριθη λεγων – E 565. 700. 1010.
απεκριθη – D
λεγει αυτω – rest of mss.

Mark 5:9

λεγιων ονομα μοι – א B C L Δ
λεγεων – A W Θ ƒ^{1} ƒ^{13} Byz

Mark 5:37

ουδενα μετ' αυτου συνακολουθεσαι – א B C L Δ 892.
ουδενα αυτω συνακολουθεσαι – A Θ 0132 0133^{c} ƒ^{13} Byz
ουδενα αυτω παρακολουθεσαι – D W 0133* ƒ^{1} 28. 565. 700. pc
ουδενα αυτω ακολουθεσαι – A K 33. 1241. al

3 Textual variants in Mark 6

Mark 6:3

ο αδελφος Ἰακώβου - 565. 700. 892.^{c} (Θ 2542.) lat
και ἀδελφὸς Ἰακώβου – B C Δ 579. 1241. 1424.
και ο αδελφος Ἰακώβου - א D L 892.* sa^{ms} bo^{pt}
ἀδελφὸς δὲ Ἰακώβου – A K N W ƒ^{1} ƒ^{13} 28. Byz q sy^{h} sa^{ms}

Mark 6:33

ἐκεῖ καὶ προῆλθον αὐτούς – א B 0187 (omit εκει), 892. ℓ 49 ℓ 69 ℓ 70 ℓ 299 ℓ 303 ℓ 333 ℓ 1579 (ℓ 950 αυτους), it^{aur}, vg, (cop^{sa,bo})
ἐκει καὶ προσηλθον αὐτοῖς – L 1241 (Δ Θ ℓ 10 αὐτοῖς) ℓ 12 ℓ 80 ℓ 184 ℓ 211 ℓ 1127 arm, geo
ἐκεῖ καὶ συνῆλθον αὐτῷ – D^{gr} it^{b}
ἐκεῖ καὶ συνῆλθον αὐτοῦ – 28. 700.
ἐκεῖ καὶ ἢλθον αὐτοῦ – 565. it^{(a),d,ff,i,r}, Diatessaron
καὶ ἢλθον ἐκεῖ – ƒ^{1}
προηλθον αὐτὸν ἐκεῖ – Peshitta
πρὸς αὐτούς καὶ συνῆλθον πρὸς αὐτον – 33.
ἐκεῖ καὶ προῆλθον αὐτοῖς καὶ συνῆλθον πρὸς αὐτον – K Π (ƒ^{13} συνεισηλθον προς αὐτούς) 1009. 1010. 1071. 1079. 1195. 1216. 1230. 1242. 1365. 1546. 1646. 2148. 2174. Byz
ἐκεῖ καὶ προῆλθον αὐτοῖς καὶ συνέδραμον πρὸς αὐτον – A
ἐκει – W ℓ 150 it^{c}

Mark 6:51

ἐξίσταντο – א B L Δ 28. 892. it^{c, ff^{2}, i, l} vg syr^{s} cop^{sa, bo}, geo
ἐξεπλήσσοντο – ƒ^{1}
ἐξίσταντο καὶ ἐθαύμαζον – A D K W X Θ Π ƒ^{13} 33. 565. 700. 1009. 1010. 1079. 1195. 1216. 1230. 1241. 1242. 1253. 1344. 1365. 1546. 1646. 2148. 2174. Byz, Lect
ἐθαύμαζον καὶ ἐξίσταντο – 517. 1424.

2 Textual variants in Mark 7

Mark 7:2

πυγμη – A B D K L X Θ Π
πυκνα – א W vg
omit – Δ syr^{s} sa

Mark 7:16

verse is omitted by א Β L Δ 28.

1 Textual variants in Mark 8

Mark 8:10

τὰ μέρη Δαλμανουθά – א A Β C K L X Δ Π 0131 33. 700. 892. 1009. 1010. 1195. 1216. 1230. 1242. 1253. 1344. 1365. 1546. 1646. 2148. 2174. Byz, Lect, it, vg, syr, cop
τὰ ὂρη Δαλμανουθά – 1071
τὸ ὂρος Δαλμανοῦναι – W
τὰ ὅρια Δαλμανουθά – 1241
τὸ ὂρος Μαγεδά – 28
τὰ ὅρια Μελεγαδά – D^{gr}
τὰ μέρη Μαγδαλά – Θ ƒ^{1} ƒ^{13} ℓ 80
τὰ μέρη Μαγεδά – 565.

1 Textual variants in Mark 9

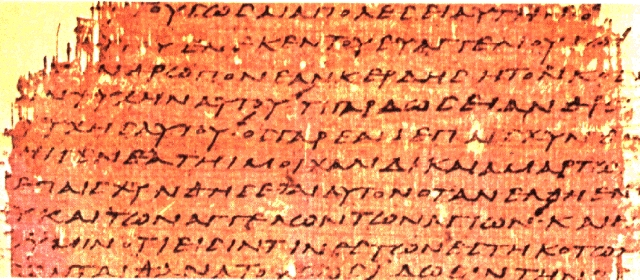
Mark 8:35-9:1 in Papyrus 45.

Mark 9:49

πας γαρ πυρι αλισθησεται – (א εν πυρι) B L W Δ ƒ^{1} ƒ^{13} 28 565. 700. ℓ260 syr^{s} sa
πασα γαρ θυσια αλι αλισθησεται – D it
πας γαρ πυρι αλισθησεται και πασα θυσια αλι αλισθησεται – A (C εν πυρι) K (X πυρι αλι αλισθησεται) Π (Ψ θυσια αναλωθησεται)
πας γαρ πυρι αναλωθησεται και πασα θυσια αλι αλισθησεται – Θ

3 Textual variants in Mark 10

Mark 10:1

εἰς τὰ ὅρια τῆς Ἰουδαίας καὶ πέραν τοῦ Ἰορδάνου, (to the region/border of Judea, and/also/even/namely beyond the Jordan,) – Alexandrian text-type: Westcott and Hort 1881, Westcott and Hort / [NA27 and UBS4 variants], Tischendorf 8th Edition 1864–94, Nestle 1904
εἰς τὰ ὅρια τῆς Ἰουδαίας διὰ τοῦ πέραν τοῦ Ἰορδάνου· (to the region/border of Judea by/through the [land] beyond the Jordan.) – Byz: Stephanus Textus Receptus 1550, Scrivener's Textus Receptus 1894, RP Byzantine Majority Text 2005, Greek Orthodox Church

Mark 10:2

προσελθόντες Φαρισαῖοι (the Pharisees came) – A B K L Γ Δ Ψ ƒ^{13} 28. 700. 892. 1010. 1079. 1546. 1646. Byz cop^{bo} goth
προσελθόντες οἱ Φαρισαῖοι (word order varies) – א C X
verse omitted by D a, b, d, k, r^{1}, syr^{sin} (syr^{cur})

Mark 10:47

Ναζαρηνός – B L W Δ Θ Ψ
Ναζορηνός – D
Ναζωρινός – 28
Ναζωραιός – א A C

1 Textual variants in Mark 11

Mark 11:26

Verse omitted by א B L W Δ Ψ 565. 700. 892. 1216. k, l, syr^{s,pal}, cop
Verse included by K X Θ Π 28. Byz

1 Textual variants in Mark 12

Mark 12:19

τέκνον - א^{c2a} B L W Δ Θ Codex Athous Lavrensis ƒ^{1:}^{(1. 118. 205. 209. 872. 1582.)} 579. 700. 892. 1093. 1342. 1654. 2193. 2542. 2786. 2886. it
τέκνα - 𝔓^{45} D ƒ^{13:}^{(13. 69. 124. 346. 543. 788. 826. 828. 983. 1689.)} 28. 427. 565. 732. 740. 792. 1424. 1542.^{s} 1593. ℓ 950 Byz lat sy^{s,}^{h,}^{p} co go eth

1 Textual variants in Mark 13

Mark 13:32

οὐδὲ ὁ υἱός - All manuscripts except those cited below
omit - X 389. 983. 1273. 1689. vg^{ms}

5 Textual variants in Mark 14

Mark 14:30

πρὶν ἢ δὶς ἀλέκτορα φωνῆσαι (before that the rooster has crowed twice) – A Byz
πρὶν ἀλέκτορα φωνῆσαι (before the rooster has crowed) – א C* aeth, arm, Western text-type: D cu2 lat.afr-eur

Mark 14:39

τὸν αὐτὸν λόγον εἰπών (spoke the same words) – omitted by D a, b, c, d, ff^{2}, k, (syr^{cur})

Mark 14:68

καὶ άλέκτωρ ἐφώνησεν (and the rooster crowed) – inserted by Western and Byzantine text-types after προαύλιον; not found in Alexandrian text-type (א B L it, 17 c, me)

Mark 14:72a

εὐθὺς (immediately) – Alexandrian text-type; omitted by Byz
ἐκ δευτέρου (for the second time) – omitted by א c, L c, vg.cod

Mark 14:72b

πριν αλεκτορα φωνηϲαι τριϲ με απαρνηϲη (before the rooster has crowed thrice me you will have denied) – א c; several other mss also omit δίς (twice)
mss such as A and Byz do include δίς (twice), but in varying word orders:

Πρὶν ἀλέκτορα δὶς φωνῆσαι τρίς με ἀπαρνήσῃ (before the rooster twice has crowed thrice me you will have denied) – Westcott and Hort 1881, Westcott and Hort / [NA27 and UBS4 variants], Nestle 1904
Πρὶν ἀλέκτορα φωνῆσαι δίς, ἀπαρνήσῃ με τρίς (before the rooster has crowed twice, you will have denied me thrice) – Stephanus Textus Receptus 1550, Scrivener's Textus Receptus 1894, RP Byzantine Majority Text 2005, Greek Orthodox Church
πρὶν ἀλέκτορα φωνῆσαι δὶς τρίς με ἀπαρνήσῃ (before the rooster has crowed twice thrice me you will have denied) – Tischendorf 8th Edition 1864–94

4 Textual variants in Mark 15

Mark 15:28

Verse omitted by א B C D Ψ k syr^{s} cop

Mark 15:34 (see Ps 22:2)

ἐγκατέλιπές με (forsaken me) – א B Ψ 059 vg, syr^{s, p}, cop^{sa, bo, fay}, geo
ἐγκατέλειπές με – L 0112 565. 892.
με ἐγκατέλιπες (see Mt 27:46) – C P, X Δ Θ Π^{2}, ƒ^{1} ƒ^{13} 28. 700. 1010. 1071. 1079. 1195. 1216. 1230. 1241. 1242. 1253. 1344. 1365. 1546. 1646. 2148. 2174. Byz, Lect, it, goth
με ἐγκατέλειπες – A Π*
με ἐγκατέλειπας – K 1009. (ℓ 70)
με ἐγκατέλιπας – 33.
ὠνείδισάς με (insult me) – (D) it^{c, (i), (k)}

Mark 15:40

Μαρία ἡ Ἰακώβου τοῦ μικροῦ καὶ Ἰωσῆτος μήτηρ, (Mary the mother of James the Less and Joses,) – א^{c2} B (ἡ Ἰωσῆτος) Δ Θ 0184 ƒ^{1} 1542.^{s*} ℓ 844
Μαρία ἡ τοῦ Ἰακώβου τοῦ μικροῦ καὶ Ἰωσῆ μήτηρ, (Mary the mother of James the Less and Joses,) – A Γ 700. 1241. Byz

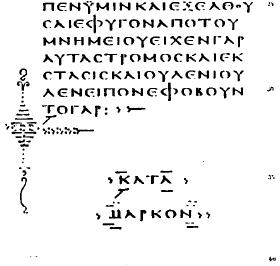
The end of Mark in Vaticanus

Mark 15:47

Μαρία ἡ Ἰωσῆτος (Mary the mother of Joses) – א^{c2} B Δ Ψ^{*} 083 ƒ^{1} sy^{p, h}
Μαρία Ἰωσῆ (Mary the mother of Joses) – 28. 205. 209. 273. 427. 579. 700. 732. 892. 1424. 1593. 2193.^{c} 2738. 2886. ℓ 60^{(1)} ℓ 387^{(1)} ℓ 950 Byz

1 Textual variants in Mark 16

Mark 16:8-20

Entire pericope omitted by א B 304

== Gospel of Luke ==
3 Textual variants in Luke 1

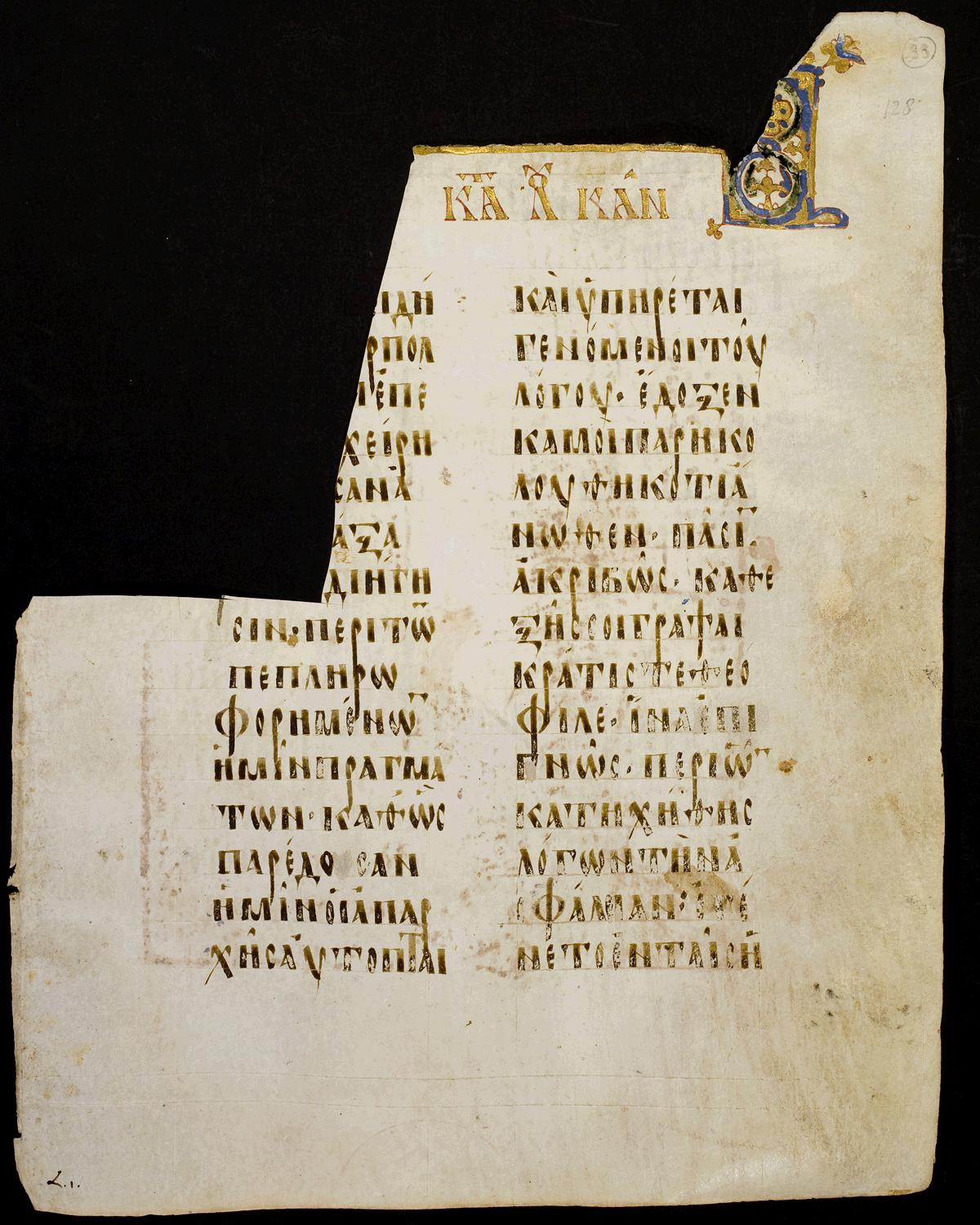
Codex Boreelianus, beginning of Luke

Luke 1:28

καὶ εἰσελθὼν πρὸς αὐτὴν εἶπεν Χαῖρε, κεχαριτωμένη, ὁ Κύριος μετὰ σοῦ. (and [he] went to her and said: "Greetings, favoured one, the lord is with you.") – Alexandrian text-type: Westcott and Hort 1881, Westcott and Hort / [NA27 and UBS4 variants], 1864–94, Nestle 1904
καὶ εἰσελθὼν πρὸς αὐτὴν ὁ ἄγγελος εἶπεν· χαῖρε, κεχαριτωμένη, ὁ κύριος μετὰ σοῦ. (and the angel went to her and said: "Greetings, favoured one, the lord is with you.") – Tischendorf 8th Edition
Καὶ εἰσελθὼν ὁ ἄγγελος πρὸς αὐτὴν εἴπεν, Χαῖρε, κεχαριτωμένη· ὁ κύριος μετὰ σοῦ, εὐλογημένη σὺ ἐν γυναιξίν. (And the angel went to her and said: "Greetings, favoured one, the Lord is with you, you are blessed among women.") – Byz: Stephanus Textus Receptus 1550, Scrivener's Textus Receptus 1894, RP Byzantine Majority Text 2005, Greek Orthodox Church

Luke 1:29

ἡ δὲ ἐπὶ τῷ λόγῳ διεταράχθη, (and she was troubled at the words,) – Alexandrian text-type: Westcott and Hort 1881, Westcott and Hort / [NA27 and UBS4 variants], 1864–94, Tischendorf 8th Edition, Nestle 1904
Ἡ δὲ ἰδοῦσα διεταράχθη ἐπὶ τῷ λόγῳ αὐτοῦ, (And when she saw [him], she was troubled at his words,) – Byz: Stephanus Textus Receptus 1550, Scrivener's Textus Receptus 1894, RP Byzantine Majority Text 2005, Greek Orthodox Church

Luke 1:75

πάσαις ταῖς ἡμέραις ἡμῶν. (all our days) – Alexandrian text-type
πάσας τὰς ἡμέρας τῆς ζωῆς ἡμῶν. (all the days of our lives) – Byz

16 Textual variants in Luke 2

Luke 2:5

γυναικί (woman) – Byz
omitted by Alexandrian text-type

Luke 2:7

φατνη (manger) – א A B D L W Θ Ξ 700
τη φατνη (the manger) – Ψ 053 f^{1} f^{13} Byz
τω σπηλαιω φατνη (the cave's manger) – Origen (via Epiphanius)

Luke 2:9

καὶ ἄγγελος (and the angel) – Alexandrian text-type
Καὶ ἰδού, ἄγγελος (And see, the angel) – Byz

εφοβηθησαν σφοδρα (they feared exceedingly) – Β
εφοβηθησαν φοβον μεγαν (they feared with great fear) – א A D L Ψ 053 f^{1} f^{13} Byz
εφοβηθησαν φοβον μεγαν σφοδρα (they feared with exceedingly great fear) – W cop^{sa}

Luke 2:12

κείμενον (lying) – omitted by Tischendorf 8th Edition

Luke 2:14

εὐδοκίας (of good will or of favour – genitive) – Alexandrian text-type
εὐδοκία (good will or favour – nominative) – Byzantine text-type

Luke 2:21

ἐπλήσθησαν (fulfilled) – א Β A L Ψ 053 f^{1} f^{13} Byz
επληρωθησαν (finished) – Θ 33
συνετελέσθησαν (completed) – D cop^{sa}

Luke 2:21

αυτον και εκληθη (and he was called) – א Β A L Ψ 053 f^{1} Βyz
αυτον εκληθη (he was called) – Θ f^{13} 565
το παιδιον ωνομασθη (the child was called) – D

Luke 2:22

αὐτῶν – א, A, B, K, L, W, Δ, Θ, Ξ, Π, Ψ, 053 etc.
αυτου – D, 2174, syr^{s}, cop^{sa}
αὐτῆς – 76
omit – 435, cop^{bo}

Luke 2:27

τοὺς γονεῖς (the parents) – almost all manuscripts, including most Byzantine and Alexandrian ones
omitted by a few late Greek manuscripts, including Minuscule 245, 1347, 1510, 2643
(Joseph and Mary) – Middle English, Tuscan, and Liège Diatessarons (13th–14th century)
(they) – Venetian Diatessaron (Codex Marcianus 4975, 14th century)

Luke 2:33

καὶ ἦν ὁ πατὴρ αὐτοῦ καὶ ἡ μήτηρ θαυμάζοντες (and his father and mother were amazed) – 01, B, D, L, W, 700, Vg, cop. Alexandrian text-type: Westcott and Hort 1881, Westcott and Hort / [NA27 and UBS4 variants], 1864–94, Nestle 1904.
καὶ ἦν ὁ πατὴρ αὐτοῦ καὶ ἡ μήτηρ αὐτοῦ θαυμάζοντες (and his father and his mother were amazed) – Tischendorf 8th Edition
καὶ ἦν Ἰωσὴφ καὶ ἡ μήτηρ αὐτοῦ θαυμάζοντες (and Joseph and his mother were amazed) – A, K, X, Δ, Θ, Π, Ψ, 053, ƒ^{13}, 28, 565, ... it syr^{ph, h, pal(MSS)}, cop^{bo(MSS)}, goth, Dia. Byz: Stephanus Textus Receptus 1550, Scrivener's Textus Receptus 1894, RP Byzantine Majority Text 2005, Greek Orthodox Church.

Luke 2:38

καὶ αὐτῇ τῇ ὥρᾳ (and at that hour) – א, A, B, D, L, W, Δ, Ξ, Ψ, 0130, 28, 33
καὶ αὕτη αὐτῇ τῇ ὥρᾳ (and at that hour she) – Θ, 053, f^{1}, f^{13}, Byz

Luke 2:40

ἐκραταιοῦτο (became strong) – Alexandrian text-type
ἐκραταιοῦτο πνεύματι (became strong in spirit) – Byz

Luke 2:41

οἱ γονεῖς αὐτοῦ (his parents) – almost all manuscripts, including most Byzantine and Alexandrian ones
ὁ τε Ἰωσὴφ καὶ ἡ Μαριάμ (both Joseph and Mary) – 1012, a, b, g^{1}, 1, r^{1}, and some Diatessarons.
(his mother) – it (Old Latin) manuscripts c and ff^{2}
(his kinsfolk) – syr^{s}, syr^{p}, Arabic Diatessaron

Luke 2:42

ἀναβάντων αὐτῶν (they went up) – Alexandrian text-type
ἀναβάντων αὐτῶν εἰς Ἰεροσόλυμα (they went up to Jerusalem) – Byz

Luke 2:43

οὐκ ἔγνωσαν οἱ γονεῖς αὐτοῦ. (his parents didn't know it.) – Alexandrian text-type. 01, B, D, L, W, θ
οὐκ ἔγνω Ἰωσὴφ καὶ ἡ μήτηρ αὐτοῦ· (Joseph and his mother didn't know it.) – Byz. A, C, Ψ, 0130, ƒ^{13}, it, syr^{p, h}, cop^{bo(MSS)} E, Π, 565
(his kinfolk didn't know it.) – syr^{s}

Luke 2:48

Ἰδού, ὁ πατήρ σου κἀγὼ ὀδυνώμενοι (ἐ)ζητοῦμεν σε. (Look, your father and I have been anxiously searching you.) – almost all manuscripts, including most Byzantine and Alexandrian ones
Ἰδού, οἱ σῠγγενεῖς σου κἀγὼ ὀδυνώμενοι (ἐ)ζητοῦμεν σε. (Look, your relatives and I have been anxiously searching you.) – C^{vid}, β, ε
Οδυνώμενοι (ἐ)ζητοῦμεν σε. ([We] have been anxiously searching you.) – a, b, ff^{2}, g^{2}, 1, r^{1}
Ἰδού, ἡμεῖς ὀδυνώμενοι (ἐ)ζητοῦμεν σε. (Look, we have been anxiously searching you.) – syr^{c}

1 Textual variants in Luke 3

Luke 3:8

καὶ μὴ ἄρξησθε λέγειν ἐν ἑαυτοῖς (And do not begin to say to yourselves) – א, A, C, B [w], D, W, Δ, Ξ,

θ, K, M, N, U, Δ, Λ, Π, 33, 157, 579, 28, 565, 700, 1071, 1424, u[w]t

καὶ μὴ δόξητε λέγειν ἐν ἑαυτοῖς (And do not think to say to yourselves) – L, Ψ
καὶ μὴ δόξησθε λέγειν ἐν ἑαυτοῖς (And do not think to yourself to say to yourselves) – Γ

1 Textual variants in Luke 4

Luke 4:17

ἀνοίξας (opened) – B, A, L, W, Ξ, 33, 892, 1195, 1241, ℓ 547, syr^{s}, h, pal, cop^{sa, bo}
ἀναπτύξας (unrolled) – א, D^{c}, K, Δ, Θ, Π, Ψ, f^{1}, f^{13}, 28, 565, 700, 1009, 1010, 1071, 1079, 1216, 1230, 1242, 1253, 1344, 1546, 1646, 2148, 2174, Byz
ἁπτύξας (touched) – D*

2 Textual variants in Luke 5

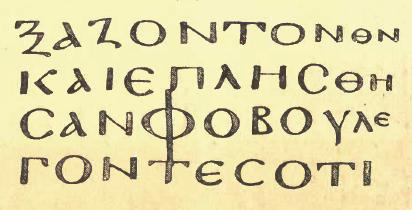
Luke 5:26 in Codex Nitriensis (Scrivener's facsimile)

Luke 5:26

και εκστασις ελαβεν απαντας και εδοξαζον τον θεον (And ecstasy took hold of them all, and they were glorifying God) – omitted by D M S W X Ψ Ω* 13 69 118 124 157 174 205 209 579 788 1241 it^{d,e}

Luke 5:39

verse omitted by D it^{mss}

1 Textual variants in Luke 6

Luke 6:4

Codex Bezae contains the following addition immediately after Luke 6:4.

Τη αυτη ημερα θεασαμενος τινα εργαζομενον τω σαββατω ειπεν αυτω ανθρωπε, ει μεν οιδας τι ποιεις, μακαριος ει ει δε μη οιδας, επικαταρατος και παραβατης ει του νομου. – D
Eodem die videns quendam operantem sabbato et dixit illi: Homo, siquidem scis, quod facis, beatus es, si autem nescis, maledictus et trabaricator legis. – d
On that same day, seeing someone working on the Sabbath, he (Jesus) said to him, "Man, if you know what you do, blessed are you; but if you do not know, you are cursed and a transgressor of the law."

2 Textual variants in Luke 7

Luke 7:7

διο ουδε εμαυτον ηξιωσα προς σε ελθειν (For this reason I did not deem myself worthy to come to you) – omitted by D 700* it^{mss} syr^{s}

Luke 7:13

ο Ιησους (Jesus) – D W f^{1} 700 1241 it^{f} vg^{mss} syr^{s,p} co^{bo}
ο κυριος (the lord) – rell

8 Textual variants in Luke 8

Luke 8:26

Γερασηνων (Gerasenes) – 𝔓^{75} B D 0267 latt co^{sa,bo^{ms}}
Γεργεσηνων (Gergesenes) – א L X Θ Ξ f^{1} 22 33 157 579 700* 1241 1342 syr^{pal} co^{bo} arm geo Eusebius Epiphanius
Γαδαρηνων (Gadarenes) – A R W Δ Ψ 0135 f^{13} 700^{c} 1071 Byz syr goth

Luke 8:43

ιατροις προσαναλωσασα ολον τομ βιον (and had spent all her living upon physicians) – omitted by 𝔓^{75} B (D) 0279 syr^{s,pal} co^{sa} arm geo Origen. Generally omitted by Alexandrian text-type, but included by Byzantine text-type. Most scholars think that inclusions of this phrase in later manuscripts are probably a result of harmonisation attempts with Mark 5:26 rather than a Lukan rewriting of the Markan original, especially because προσαναλωσασα is a hapax legomenon.
εἰς ἰατρούς προσαναλωσασα ολον τομ βιον (and had spent all her living to(wards) physicians) – Stephanus Textus Receptus 1550, Scrivener's Textus Receptus 1894

Luke 8:43

ἀπ’ οὐδενὸς ap’ oudenos ((away) from / because of no one) – Alexandrian text-type.
ὑπ’ οὐδενὸς hup’ oudenos (under(neath) / by / through no one) – Byzantine text-type.

Luke 8:45

εἶπεν ὁ Πέτρος Ἐπιστάτα, οἱ ὄχλοι συνέχουσίν σε καὶ ἀποθλίβουσιν. (Peter said: 'Master, the people are crowding and pressing against you'.) – Alexandrian text-type.
εἶπεν ὁ Πέτρος Ἐπιστάτα, οἱ ὄχλοι συνέχουσίν σε καὶ ἀποθλίβουσιν. (Peter and those beside him said: 'Master, the people are crowding and pressing against you'.) – Tischendorf 8th Edition
εἴπεν ὁ Πέτρος καὶ οἱ μετ’ αὐτοῦ, Ἐπιστάτα, οἱ ὄχλοι συνέχουσίν σε καὶ ἀποθλίβουσιν, καὶ λέγεις, Tίς ὁ ἁψάμενός μου; (Peter and those with him said: 'Master, the people are crowding and pressing against you, and you say: "Who touched me?"') – Byzantine text-type.

Luke 8:48

Θυγάτηρ, ("Daughter,...") – Alexandrian text-type.
Θάρσει, θύγατερ, ("Courage, daughter,...") – Byzantine text-type.

Luke 8:49

μηκέτι σκύλλε τὸν διδάσκαλον ("... do not trouble the teacher anymore.") – Alexandrian text-type.
μὴ σκύλλε τὸν διδάσκαλον ("... do not trouble the teacher.") – Byzantine text-type.

Luke 8:51

οὐκ ἀφῆκεν εἰσελθεῖν τινα σὺν αὐτῷ εἰ μὴ Πέτρον καὶ Ἰωάνην καὶ Ἰάκωβον (he did not allow anybody to enter with him if not Peter and John and James) – Alexandrian text-type.
οὐκ ἀφῆκεν εἰσελθεῖν οὐδένα, εἰ μὴ Πέτρον καὶ Ἰάκωβον καὶ Ἰωάννην, (he did not allow nobody to enter if not Peter and James and John) – Byzantine text-type.

Luke 8:54

αὐτὸς δὲ κρατήσας τῆς χειρὸς αὐτῆς (But he took her by the hand) – Alexandrian text-type.
αὐτὸς δὲ ἐκβαλὼν ἔξω πάντας, καὶ κρατήσας τῆς χειρὸς αὐτῆς (But he put them all outside, and took her by the hand) – Byzantine text-type.

3 Textual variants in Luke 9

Luke 9:35

ἐκλελεγμένος (Elect One) – 𝔓^{45} 𝔓^{75} א B L Ξ 892 1241 a aur ff^{2} l vgst syr^{s}
εκλεκτος (elected) – Θ f^{1} 1365
αγαπητος (beloved) – A C K P W X Δ Π f^{13} 28 33 565 700 Byz Marcion
αγαπητος εν ο ευδοκησα (beloved one in whom I am well-pleased) – C^{3} D Ψ ℓ 19 ℓ 31 ℓ 47 ℓ 48 ℓ 49 ℓ 49^{m} ℓ 183 ℓ 183^{m} ℓ 211^{m}

Luke 9:54

, ὡς καὶ Ἠλίας ἐποίησε(ν); (", just like Elias did?") – Byz: Stephanus Textus Receptus 1550, Scrivener's Textus Receptus 1894, RP Byzantine Majority Text 2005, Greek Orthodox Church
omitted by Alexandrian text-type: Westcott and Hort 1881, Westcott and Hort / [NA27 and UBS4 variants], Tischendorf 8th Edition 1864–94, Nestle 1904

Luke 9:55–56

στραφεις δε επετιμησεν αυτοις (but He turned and rebuked them) – 𝔓^{45} 𝔓^{75} א B C L W X Δ Ξ Ψ 28 33 565 892 1009 1010 1071 Byz^{pt} Lect
στραφεις δε επετιμησεν αυτοις και ειπεν, Ουκ οιδατε ποιου πνευματος εστε (but He turned and rebuked them and He said: "You do not know what manner of spirit you are of) – D (ℓ 1127^{m}) d geo
στραφεις δε επετιμησεν αυτοις καὶ εἶπεν, Οὑκ οἴδατε οἵου πνεύματος ἑστε ὐμεῖς; ὀ γὰρ υἰὸς τοῦ ἁνθρώπου οὑκ ἦλθεν ψυχὰς ἁνθρώπων ἁπολέσαι ἁλλὰ σῶσαι (but He turned and rebuked them and He said: "You do not know what manner of spirit you are of; for the Son of man came not to destroy men's lives, but to save them) – K Π 1079 1242 1546 (f^{1} omit γαρ) (Θ f^{13} omit υμεις and γαρ)

1 Textual variants in Luke 10

Luke 10:41–42

instead μεριμνας και θορυβαζη περι πολλα, ολιγων (ενος) δε εστιν χρεια Μαριαμ γαρ (you are worried and being troubled about many things Miriam, but not much (one thing) is needed) has only θορυβαζη (you are being troubled) with (D has also Μαριὰμ Miriam) (a, b, d, e, ff^{2}, i, l, r^{1}, syr^{s}, Ambrose omit θορυβαζη)

2 Textual variants in Luke 11

Luke 11:2

ἐλθέτω τὸ πνεῦμα σου τὸ ἄγιον εφ ημας και καθαρισατω ημας (May your Holy Spirit come upon us and purify us) – 162, 700
ἐφ ἡμᾶς ἐλθέτω σου ἡ βασιλεία (let thine kingdom come upon us) – D, it^{d}
ἐλθέτω ἡ βασιλεία σου (May your kingdom come) – A, B, K, L, X, Θ, Π, Ψ, f^{1}, 28, 33, (565, 1253), 892, 1009, 1010, 1071, 1079, 1195, 1216, 1230, 1242, 1344, 1365, 1546, 1646, 2148, 2174, Byz, Lect, ℓ 69, ℓ 185, ℓ 1127, it, vg, syr, cop^{sa, bo}, arm, geo, Origen
ἐλθάτω ἡ βασιλεία σου (May your kingdom come) – C, P, W, Δ, f^{13}, 1241, (𝔓^{45} indistinguishable ἐλθάτω or ἐλθέτω)
omit – geo

Luke 11:13

πνευμα αγιον – 𝔓^{75}, א, B, C, K, W, X, Δ, Π, Ψ, f^{1}, f^{13}, 28
πνευμα αγαθον – L 1230 1253 1646, ℓ 4, ℓ 12, ℓ 15, ℓ 19, ℓ 69, ℓ 185, ℓ 211
δοματα αγαθα – Θ, ℓ 32^{m}

2 Textual variants in Luke 12

Luke 12:14

κριτὴν ἢ μεριστήν (judge or divider) – 𝔓^{75}, א, B, L, 0191, f^{1}, f^{13}, 33, 700, 892, 1241, cop^{sa}^{^{mss}}
δικαστὴν ἢ μεριστήν (judge or divider) – A, K, W, X, Δ, Θ, Π, Ψ, 565, 1009, 1010, 1071, 1079, 1195, 1216, 1230, 1242, 1253, 1344, 1365, 1546, 1646, 2148, 2174, Byz
μεριστὴν ἢ δικαστήν (divider or judge) – 472, ℓ 1642, eth
κριτὴν ἢ δικαστήν (divider or judge) – 69
ἄρχοντα καὶ δικαστήν (ruler and judge) – 157
κριτήν (judge) – D, it^{(a), c, d}
δικαστήν (judge) – 28
μεριστήν (divider) – cop^{sa}^{^{mss}}

Luke 12:21

verse omitted by – D, a, b, d

1 Textual variants in Luke 13

Luke 13:31

Ἐν αὐτῇ τῇ ὥρᾳ (At that very hour / In the same hour / Just at that time / At that same time) – Alexandrian text-type.
Ἐν αὐτῇ τῇ ἡμέρᾳ (On that very day / (On) the same day) – Byzantine text-type.

1 Textual variants in Luke 14

Luke 14:5

υἱὸς ἢ βοῦς – 𝔓^{45}, 𝔓^{75}, B, W, Δ, 28, 565, 700
υἱὸς ὑμῶν – 1344, ℓ 184, ℓ 1579
ὄνος ἢ βοῦς – א, K, L, X, Π, Ψ, f^{1}, f^{13}, 33, 892, 1071, ℓ 547
ὄνος υἱὸς ἢ βοῦς – Θ
πρόβατον ἢ βοῦς – D
υἱὸς ἢ βοῦς ἢ ὄνος – 2174, syr^{c}

3 Textual variants in Luke 15

Luke 15:16

καὶ ἐπεθύμει γεμίσαι τὴν κοιλίαν αὐτοῦ ἐκ τῶν κερατίων (And he longed to fill his stomach out of the pods) – Nestle 1904.
καὶ ἐπεθύμει χορτασθῆναι ἐκ τῶν κερατίων (And he longed to feed out of the pods) – Westcott and Hort 1881, Westcott and Hort / [NA27 and UBS4 variants]
καὶ ἐπεθύμει γεμίσαι τὴν κοιλίαν αὐτοῦ ἀπὸ τῶν κερατίων (And he longed to fill his stomach from the pods) – Byzantine text-type.

Luke 15:21

ποίησον με ὡς ἕνα τῶν μισθίων σου. (Make me as one of your hired servants) – Westcott and Hort 1881, Westcott and Hort / [NA27 and UBS4 variants]
omitted by Byzantine text-type, and other Alexandrian mss

Luke 15:23

φέρετε (having brought [imperfect]) – 𝔓75 א B L 579 1241 pc WH; Alexandrian text-type.
ἐνέγκαντες (bring [imperative]) – ἐνέγκαντες A W Θ Ψ f1 f13 ς Byz
ἐνέγκαντε (bring [imperative]) – D 1424 pc

1 Textual variants in Luke 16

Luke 16:21

ἀπὸ τῶν πιπτόντων ἀπὸ τῆς τραπέζης (from the fallings from the table) – Alexandrian text-type.
ἀπὸ τῶν ψιχίων τῶν πιπτόντων ἀπὸ τῆς τραπέζης (from the crumbs of the fallings from the table) – Byzantine text-type.

7 Textual variants in Luke 17

Luke 17:3

ἁμάρτῃ ὁ ἀδελφός σου (Should a brother of yours sin...) – א A B L W f^{1} 205 892 1071 1241 it^{a} it^{aur} it^{b} it^{f} it^{ff2} it^{i} it^{l} it^{λ} vg^{ww} vg^{st} syr^{c} syr^{s} syr^{p} syr^{h} syr^{pal} cop^{sa} cop^{bo} arm geo^{1} slav Clement Basil WH NR CEI Riv NM
ἐὰν ἁμάρτῃ ὁ ἀδελφός σου (If a brother of yours should sin...) – WH NR CEI ND Riv TILC Nv NM Alexandrian text-type.
ἐὰν δὲ ἁμάρτῃ εἰς σὲ ὁ ἀδελφός σου (But/and if a brother of yours should sin against you...) – Byzantine text-type.

ἐὰν δὲ ἁμάρτῃ (But/and if ... should sin...) – Byz ς Dio
ἁμάρτῃ εἰς σὲ (...should sin against you...) – E F G H N Ψ 28 157 180 565 579 597 700 1006 1010 1243 1292 1342 1424 1505 Byz Lect^{pt} l^{AD} it^{c} it^{d} it^{e} it^{q} it^{r1} vg^{cl} cop^{bo(mss)} eth geo^{2} Ambrose Augustine ς ND Dio TILC Nv
ἁμαρτήσῃ εἰς σὲ (...should sin against you...) – D Δ f^{13} Lect^{pt}

ἁμαρτήσῃ (should sin) – Θ
Lacune in minuscule 472, α 1386

Luke 17:4

ἑπτάκις ἐπιστρέψῃ πρὸς σὲ (seven times should return to you) – א B D L Ψ (2542) 579 892 1241 al it vg syr Clement WH; Alexandrian text-type.
ἑπτάκις τῆς ἡμέρας ἐπιστρέψῃ (seven times in a day should return) – W Θ f^{13} Byz vg syr^{p} syr^{h} cop^{sa} cop^{bo(pt)} ND Dio TILC Nv
ἑπτάκις τῆς ἡμέρας ἐπιστρέψῃ πρὸς σὲ (seven times in a day should return to you) – A f^{1}
ἑπτάκις τῆς ἡμέρας ἐπιστρέψῃ ἐπὶ σὲ (seven times in a day should return before you) – ς

Luke 17:9

οὐ δοκῶ. (I think not. or I don't think so.) – Byzantine text-type.
omitted by Alexandrian text-type.

Luke 17:11

διὰ μέσον (through/among [the] middle of/between/amidst [accusative]) – 𝔓^{75vid} א B L 579 1424 pc WH
διὰ μέσου (through/amidst/between/along [the] middle of/between/amidst [genitive]) – A W Θ Ψ 33 Byz ς
ἀνὰ μέσον (up(wards)/along/throughout/up to [the] middle of/between/amidst [accusative]) – f^{1} f^{13} 2542 Titus-Bostra
μέσον ([the] middle of/between/amidst [accusative]) – D

Luke 17:24

ἐκ τῆς ὑπὸ τὸν οὐρανὸν εἰς τὴν ὑπ’ οὐρανὸν. (literally from the under the sky to the under sky) – Alexandrian text-type, Stephanus Textus Receptus 1550, Scrivener's Textus Receptus 1894.
ἐκ τῆς ὑπ’ οὐρανὸν εἰς τὴν ὑπ’ οὐρανὸν (literally from the under sky to the under sky) – RP Byzantine Majority Text 2005.
ἐκ τῆς ὑπ’ οὐρανὸν (literally from the under sky) – Greek Orthodox Church.

Luke 17:24

ὁ υἱὸς τοῦ ἀνθρώπου ἐν τῇ ἡμέρᾳ αὐτοῦ (the Son of Man in his day) – א A E G H K L W X Δ Θ Π Ψ 063 f^{1} f^{13} 28 180 205 565 579 597 700 892 1006 1009 1010 1071 1079 1195 1216 1230 1241 1242 1243 1253 1292 1342 1344 1365 1424 1505 1546 1646 2148 2174 Byz Lect it^{aur} it^{q} it^{r1} vg (syr^{c}) (syr^{s}) syr^{p} syr^{h} cop^{bo} goth arm geo slav (NA [ἐν τῇ ἡμέρᾳ αὐτοῦ]) NR CEI Riv TILC Nv
καὶ ὁ υἱὸς τοῦ ἀνθρώπου ἐν τῇ ἡμέρᾳ αὐτοῦ (and the Son of Man in his day) – N 157 ℓ76 ℓ950 ℓ1127 ς ND Dio
ἡ παρουσια τοῦ υἱοῦ τοῦ ἀνθρώπου (the Second Coming of the Son of Man) – it^{c} (it^{l}) it^{s} cop^{bo(ms)} eth Ambrose Maximus (see Matt. 24:27)
ἡ παρουσια τοῦ υἱοῦ τοῦ ἀνθρώπου ἐν τῇ ἡμέρᾳ αὐτοῦ (the Second Coming of the Son of Man in his day) – it^{f} Vigilius
ὁ υἱὸς τοῦ ἀνθρώπου (the Son of Man) – 𝔓^{75} B (D it^{b} it^{d} it^{e} it^{i} καὶ ὁ) it^{a} cop^{sa} WH NM.

Luke 17:36 (see Matt. 24:40)

verse omitted by א, A, B, K, L, W, X, Δ, Θ, Π, Ψ, 063, f^{1}, 28, 33, 565, 892, 1009, 1010, 1079, 1195, 1216, 1242, 1365, Byz, ℓ 184, ℓ 950, cop^{sa, bo}, goth, eth
δύο ἐν ἀγρῷ εἷς παραλημφθήσεται καὶ ὁ ἕτερος ἀφεθήσεται (two in the field; one will be taken and the other left) – D, 1071, 1230, 2174, ℓ 185, ℓ 1579, it, vg, syr, arm, geo, Diatessaron^{a, i, n}
δύο ἔσονται ἐν τῷ ἀγρῷ εἷς παραλημφθήσεται καὶ ὁ ἕτερος ἀφεθήσεται (two men will be in the field; one will be taken and the other left) – 700, 1253, 1344
δύο ἔσονται ἐν ἀγρῷ εἷς παραλημφθήσεται καὶ ὁ ἕτερος ἀφεθήσεται (two men will be in the field; one will be taken and the other left) – 1646
δύο ἔσονται ἐν ἀγρῷ εἷς παραλημφθήσεται, ἡ δὲ ἑτέρα ἀφεθήσεται (two will be in the field then; one will be taken, but the other left) – f^{13}

3 Textual variants in Luke 18

Luke 18:20

μητέρα (mother) – A B D K L P W Θ Ψ 078 f^{1} 33 892 1241 2542 al it vg syr^{h} WH
μητέρα σου (your mother) – א f^{13} Byz it^{a} it^{b} it^{c} vg^{mss} syr^{s} syr^{c} syr^{p} ς

Luke 18:24

Ἰδὼν δὲ αὐτὸν ὁ Ἰησοῦς εἶπεν (And having seen him, Jesus said) – א (B omitted ὁ) L f^{1} 157 205 579 1241 2542 syr^{pal} cop^{sa} cop^{bo} geo (WH [ὁ]) CEI NM
Ἰδὼν δὲ αὐτὸν ὁ Ἰησοῦς περίλυπον γενόμενον εἶπεν (And having seen him, Jesus became sad, and said or And having seen that he became sad, Jesus said; see Luke 18:23) – A E F G H K N P W X Δ Θ Π Ψ 078 f^{13} 28 33^{vid} 180 565 597 700 892 1006 1009 1010 1071 1079 1195 1216 1230 1242 1243 1253 1292 1342 1344 1365 (1424 ὁ Ἰησοῦς περίλυπον αὐτὸν) 1505 1546 1646 2148 2174 Byz Lect (ℓ 1016 ℓ 1627 omitted αὐτὸν) it^{a} it^{aur} (it^{f}) it^{q} vg syr^{h} goth (arm) (eth^{TH}) slav (Diatessaron^{syr} arm) ς (NA [περίλυπον γενόμενον]) (NR [περίλυπον γενόμενον]) ND (Riv) Dio TILC Nv
Ἰδὼν δὲ ὁ Ἰησοῦς αὐτὸν περίλυπον γενόμενον εἶπεν (And Jesus, having seen that he became sad, said) – syr^{c} syr^{s} syr^{p}
Ἰδὼν δὲ αὐτὸν περίλυπον γενόμενον εἶπεν ὁ Ἰησοῦς (And having seen that he became sad, said Jesus) – D it^{b} it^{c} it^{d} (it^{e}) it^{ff2} it^{i} it^{l} it^{r1} eth^{pp}

Luke 18:35

ἐπαιτῶν (begging; asking alms) – א B (D) L T 579 pc WH
προσαιτῶν (begging; asking for in addition) – A W Θ Ψ f^{1} f^{13} 33^{vid} Byz ς

1 Textual variants in Luke 19

Luke 19:5

ὁ Ἰησοῦς εἶπεν πρὸς αὐτόν (Jesus said to him) – א B L T Θ f^{1} 579 1241 2542 pc syr^{s} syr^{c} syr^{p} cop WH NR CEI Riv TILC Nv NM
ὁ Ἰησοῦς εἴδεν αὐτόν, καὶ εἴπεν πρὸς αὐτόν (Jesus saw him, and said to him) – A (D) W (Ψ) f^{13} 33^{vid} Byz it vg syr^{h} ς ND Dio

3 Textual variants in Luke 20

Luke 20:1

μιᾷ τῶν ἡμερῶν (one of the days) – א B D L Q Ψ f^{1} 579 1241 2542 pc it vg syr^{s} syr^{c} syr^{p} (cop^{sa}) cop^{bo} WH CEI TILC Nv
μιᾷ τῶν ἡμερῶν ἐκείνων (one of those days) – A C W Θ f^{13} 33 Byz syr^{h} ς NR ND Riv Dio NM

Luke 20:1

ἀρχιερεῖς (chief priests) – א B C D L N Q Θ Ψ f^{1} (f^{13}) 33 579 892 1241 1424 2542 al it vg syr cop ς WH
ἱερεῖς (priests) – A W Byz

Luke 20:9

ἄνθρωπός ἐφύτευσεν ἀμπελῶνα (a man planted a vineyard) – א B E G H K L N Q Δ Π Ψ f^{1} 28 33 180 205 565 579 597 700 892 1006 1009 1010 1079 1216 1230 1242 1243 1253 1292 1342 1424 1546 1646 2174 Byz it^{aur} it^{f} vg cop^{sa} cop^{bo} goth eth slav Origen Augustine WH
ἄνθρωπός τις ἐφύτευσεν ἀμπελῶνα (a certain man planted a vineyard) – A W Θ f^{13} 157 1071 1195 1241 1344 1365 1505 2148 2542 (it^{r1}) vg^{si} vg^{mss} syr^{c} syr^{s} syr^{p} syr^{h} arm geo (Diatessaron^{arm}) Cyril^{lem} Theodoret Ps-Athanasius ς (NA [τις])
ἀμπελῶνα ἐφύτευσεν ἄνθρωπός (a vineyard planted a man) – D it^{a} it^{c} it^{d} it^{e} it^{ff2} it^{i} it^{l} it^{q} vg^{ms} Ambrose
ἄνθρωπός ἐφύτευσεν (a man planted) – C

0 Textual variants in Luke 21

Luke 21:1

4 Textual variants in Luke 22

Luke 22:19b-20

τὸ ὑπὲρ ὑμῶν διδόμενον... τὸ ὑπὲρ ὑμῶν ἐκχυννόμενον (which is given for you... which is shed for you), omitted by D, a, (b, e have a different word order) d, ff^{2}, i, l (syr^{cur} omits only τὸ ὑπὲρ ὑμῶν ἐκχυννόμενον)

Luke 22:34

ἕως τρίς με ἀπαρνήσῃ μὴ εἰδέναι (until three times me you will deny to not know) – Nestle 1904
ἕως τρίς με ἀπαρνήσῃ εἰδέναι (until three times me you will deny to know) – Westcott and Hort 1881
πρὶν ἢ τρὶς ἀπαρνήσῃ μὴ εἰδέναι με (before the three times you will deny not to know me) – Byz

Luke 22:43-44

Luke 22:62

verse omitted by a, b, e, ff^{2}, i, l, r^{1} (0171 does not appear to leave space)

13 Textual variants in Luke 23

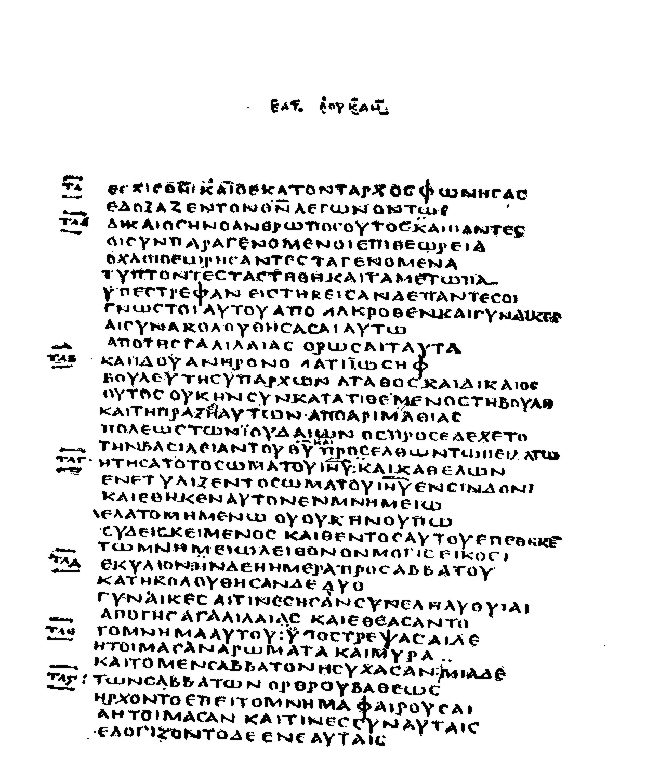
Codex Bezae, contains text Luke 23:47-24:1 (paraphrastic)

Luke 23:6

Πειλᾶτος δὲ ἀκούσας (when Pilate heard) – Alexandrian text-type: Westcott and Hort 1881, Westcott and Hort / [NA27 and UBS4 variants], 1864–94, Tischendorf 8th Edition, Nestle 1904
Πιλάτος δὲ ἀκούσας Γαλιλαίαν (when Pilate heard of Galilee) – Byz: Stephanus Textus Receptus 1550, Scrivener's Textus Receptus 1894, RP Byzantine Majority Text 2005, Greek Orthodox Church

Luke 23:8

διὰ τὸ ἀκούειν περὶ αὐτοῦ (because of hearing about him) – Alexandrian text-type: Westcott and Hort 1881, Westcott and Hort / [NA27 and UBS4 variants], 1864–94, Tischendorf 8th Edition, Nestle 1904
διὰ τὸ ἀκούειν πολλὰ περὶ αὐτοῦ (because of hearing a lot about him) – Byz: Stephanus Textus Receptus 1550, Scrivener's Textus Receptus 1894, RP Byzantine Majority Text 2005, Greek Orthodox Church

Luke 23:17

omitted – Alexandrian text-type: Westcott and Hort 1881, Westcott and Hort / [NA27 and UBS4 variants], 1864–94, Tischendorf 8th Edition, Nestle 1904
ἀνάγκην δὲ εἶχεν ἀπολύειν αὐτοῖς κατὰ ἑορτὴν ἕνα. (for it was necessary for him to release one to them at the feast) – Byz: Stephanus Textus Receptus 1550, Scrivener's Textus Receptus 1894, RP Byzantine Majority Text 2005, Greek Orthodox Church

Luke 23:19

βληθεὶς ἐν τῇ φυλακῇ (having been thrown into the prison) – Alexandrian text-type: Westcott and Hort 1881, Westcott and Hort / [NA27 and UBS4 variants], 1864–94, Tischendorf 8th Edition, Nestle 1904
βεβλημένος εἰς φυλακὴν (had been thrown into prison) – Byz: Stephanus Textus Receptus 1550, Scrivener's Textus Receptus 1894, RP Byzantine Majority Text 2005
βεβλημένος εἰς τὴν φυλακὴν (had been thrown into the prison) – Greek Orthodox Church

Luke 23:21

Σταύρου, σταύρου αὐτόν (Crucify, crucify him! [imperative singular]) – Alexandrian text-type: Westcott and Hort 1881, Westcott and Hort / [NA27 and UBS4 variants], 1864–94, Tischendorf 8th Edition, Nestle 1904
Σταύρωσον, σταύρωσον αὐτόν (Crucify, crucify him! [imperative plural]) – Byz: Stephanus Textus Receptus 1550, Scrivener's Textus Receptus 1894, RP Byzantine Majority Text 2005, Greek Orthodox Church

Luke 23:22

οὐδὲν αἴτιον (no cause/reason/fault/guilt) – Alexandrian text-type: Westcott and Hort 1881, Westcott and Hort / [NA27 and UBS4 variants], 1864–94, Tischendorf 8th Edition, Nestle 1904. Byz: Stephanus Textus Receptus 1550, Scrivener's Textus Receptus 1894, RP Byzantine Majority Text 2005.
οὐδὲν ἄξιον (not worthy/deserving/fit) – Greek Orthodox Church

Luke 23:23

αἱ φωναὶ αὐτῶν (the voices of them) – Alexandrian text-type: Westcott and Hort 1881, Westcott and Hort / [NA27 and UBS4 variants], 1864–94, Tischendorf 8th Edition, Nestle 1904
αἱ φωναὶ αὐτῶν καὶ τῶν ἀρχιερέων (the voices of them and of the chief priests) – Byz: Stephanus Textus Receptus 1550, Scrivener's Textus Receptus 1894, RP Byzantine Majority Text 2005, Greek Orthodox Church

Luke 23:25

ἀπέλυσεν δὲ τὸν (then he released the [one]) – Alexandrian text-type: Westcott and Hort 1881, Westcott and Hort / [NA27 and UBS4 variants], 1864–94, Tischendorf 8th Edition, Nestle 1904
ἀπέλυσε δὲ αὐτοῖς τὸν (then he released to them the [one]) – Byz: Stephanus Textus Receptus 1550, Scrivener's Textus Receptus 1894, RP Byzantine Majority Text 2005
ἀπέλυσε δὲ αὐτοῖς τὸν Βαραββᾶν τὸν (then he released to them Barabbas, the [one]) – Greek Orthodox Church

Luke 23:35

οἱ ἄρχοντες (the rulers) – Alexandrian text-type: Westcott and Hort 1881, Westcott and Hort / [NA27 and UBS4 variants], 1864–94, Tischendorf 8th Edition, Nestle 1904
οἱ ἄρχοντες σὺν αὐτοῖς (the rulers with them) – Byz: Stephanus Textus Receptus 1550, Scrivener's Textus Receptus 1894, RP Byzantine Majority Text 2005, Greek Orthodox Church

Luke 23:38

ἦν δὲ καὶ ἐπιγραφὴ ἐπ’ αὐτῷ· ὁ βασιλεὺς τῶν Ἰουδαίων οὗτος. (There was also an inscription above him: "The king of the Jews, this [is].") – Alexandrian text-type: Westcott and Hort 1881, Westcott and Hort / [NA27 and UBS4 variants], 1864–94, Tischendorf 8th Edition, Nestle 1904
ἦν δὲ καὶ ἐπιγραφὴ γεγραμμένη ἐπ’ αὐτῷ γράμμασιν Ἑλληνικοῖς καὶ Ρωμαϊκοῖς καὶ Ἑβραϊκοῖς, Οὗτός ἐστιν ὁ βασιλεὺς τῶν Ἰουδαίων. (There was also an inscription written above him in Greek and Latin and Hebrew letters: "This is the king of the Jews.") – Byz: Stephanus Textus Receptus 1550, Scrivener's Textus Receptus 1894, RP Byzantine Majority Text 2005, Greek Orthodox Church

Luke 23:39

Οὐχὶ σὺ εἶ ὁ Χριστός; σῶσον σεαυτὸν καὶ ἡμᾶς. (Are you not the Christ/Messiah? Save yourself and us!) – Alexandrian text-type: Westcott and Hort 1881, Westcott and Hort / [NA27 and UBS4 variants], 1864–94, Tischendorf 8th Edition, Nestle 1904
Εἰ σὺ εἶ ὁ Χριστός, σῶσον σεαυτὸν καὶ ἡμᾶς. (If you are the Christ/Messiah, save yourself and us!) – Byz: Stephanus Textus Receptus 1550, Scrivener's Textus Receptus 1894, RP Byzantine Majority Text 2005, Greek Orthodox Church

Luke 23:42

καὶ ἔλεγεν Ἰησοῦ, μνήσθητί μου (And he said: "Jesus, remember me..." or And he said to Jesus: "Remember me...") – Alexandrian text-type: Westcott and Hort 1881, Westcott and Hort / [NA27 and UBS4 variants], 1864–94, Nestle 1904
καὶ ἔλεγεν· Ἰησοῦ, μνήσθητί μου (And he said: "Jesus, remember me..."') – Tischendorf 8th Edition
Καὶ ἔλεγεν τῷ Ἰησοῦ,/· Μνήσθητί μου, κύριε/Κύριε, (And he said to Jesus: "Remember me, Lord/lord,..."') – Byz: Stephanus Textus Receptus 1550, Scrivener's Textus Receptus 1894, RP Byzantine Majority Text 2005, Greek Orthodox Church

Luke 23:45

τοῦ ἡλίου ἐκλιπόντος (the sun ended/failed/ceased/left out) – Alexandrian text-type: Westcott and Hort 1881, Westcott and Hort / [NA27 and UBS4 variants], 1864–94, Nestle 1904. Greek Orthodox Church (Luke 23:44).
καὶ ἐσκοτίσθη ὁ ἥλιος (and the sun darkened) – Byz: Stephanus Textus Receptus 1550, Scrivener's Textus Receptus 1894, RP Byzantine Majority Text 2005

19 Textual variants in Luke 24

Luke 24:1

ἐπὶ τὸ μνημειον ἦλθον (to the memorial/monument they went) – 𝔓^{75} א C* Δ al Eusebius
ἐπὶ τὸ μνῆμα ἦλθον (to the memory they went) – Alexandrian text-type: Westcott and Hort 1881, Westcott and Hort / [NA27 and UBS4 variants], 1864–94, Nestle 1904
ἦλθον ἐπὶ τὸ μνῆμα (they went to the memory) – ς, Byz: Stephanus Textus Receptus 1550, Scrivener's Textus Receptus 1894, RP Byzantine Majority Text 2005, Greek Orthodox Church

Luke 24:1

ἀρώματα (spices) – 𝔓^{75} א B C* L 33 pc l^{844} it vg cop^{bo(pt)} WH NR CEI Riv TILC Nv NM. Alexandrian text-type: Westcott and Hort 1881, Westcott and Hort / [NA27 and UBS4 variants], 1864–94, Nestle 1904
ἀρώματα καί τινες σὺν αὐταῖς (spices and certain others with her) – A C W Θ Ψ f^{1}, f^{13}, Byz, it^{f} it^{q} it^{r1} (syr cop^{bo(pt)}) ς ND Dio. Byz: Stephanus Textus Receptus 1550, Scrivener's Textus Receptus 1894, RP Byzantine Majority Text 2005, Greek Orthodox Church
ἀρώματα. ἐλογίζοντο δὲ ἐν ἑαυταῖς, τίς ἄρα ἀποκυλίσει τὸν λίθον. [2] ἐλθοῦσαι δὲ εὗρον (...spices. And they were thinking to themselves: "So, who will roll the stone away?" [2] But as they were coming... see Mark 16:3) – D (070 it^{c}) it^{d} cop^{sa}

Luke 24:3

τοῦ κυρίου Ἰησοῦ (of the Lord Jesus) – 𝔓^{75}, א, A, B, C, K, L, W, X, Δ, Θ, Π, Ψ, 0124, f^{1}, f^{13}, 28, 33, 565, 700, 892, 1009, 1010, Byz, Lect, it^{aur, c, f, q}, vg
του Ιησου (Jesus) – 579, 1071, 1241, syr^{cur}
omitted by D, a, b, d, e, ff^{2}, l, r^{1}

Luke 24:6

οὐκ ἔστιν ὢδε, ἀλλ(ὰ) ἠγέρθη (He is not here, but is risen), omitted by D, a, b, d, e, ff^{2}, l, r^{1}, arm^{mss}, geo^{B}

Luke 24:9

απο του μνημειου (from the tomb), omitted by D, a, b, c, d, e, ff^{2}, l, r^{1}, arm, geo

Luke 24:12

verse omitted by D, a, b, d, e, l, r^{1}

Luke 24:13

ἑξήκοντα (sixty) – 𝔓^{75} A B D E F G H K^{2} L W X Δ Ψ 063 070 f1 f13 28 33vid 157 180 205 565 579 597 700 892 1006 1009 1010 1071 1079^{c} 1195 1216 1230 1241 1242 1243 1253 1292 1342 1344 1365 1424 1505 1546 1646 2148 2174 Byz Lect it^{a} it^{aur} it^{b} it^{c} it^{d} it^{f} it^{ff2} it^{l} vg syr^{c} syr^{s} syr^{p} syr^{h} cop^{sa} cop^{bo} eth slav Augustine ς WH
ἑκατόν ἑξήκοντα (hundred sixty) – א K* N^{vid} Θ Π 079 1079* pc l^{844} l^{2211} vg^{mss} syr^{pal} arm geo Eusebius Jerome Sozomen
ἑπτὰ (seven) – it^{e}

Luke 24:17

περιπατοῦντες; καὶ ἐστάθησαν σκυθρωποί. ("...as you are walking?" They stood still, looking sad.) – Alexandrian text-type: Westcott and Hort 1881, Westcott and Hort / [NA27 and UBS4 variants], 1864–94, Tischendorf 8th Edition, Nestle 1904
περιπατοῦντες, καί ἐστε σκυθρωποί; ("...as you are walking and are sad?") – Byz: Stephanus Textus Receptus 1550, Scrivener's Textus Receptus 1894, RP Byzantine Majority Text 2005, Greek Orthodox Church

Luke 24:26

δοξαν – majority of mss
βασιλειαν – 𝔓^{75}

Luke 24:36

omitted – Alexandrian text-type: Westcott and Hort 1881, Westcott and Hort / [NA27 and UBS4 variants] 1864–94, Tischendorf 8th Edition, Nestle 1904
ὁ Ἰησοῦς (Jesus) – Byz: Stephanus Textus Receptus 1550, Scrivener's Textus Receptus 1894, RP Byzantine Majority Text 2005, Greek Orthodox Church

Luke 24:36

καὶ λέγει αὐτοῖς εἰρήνη ὑμῖν (and said to them: Peace unto you) – mss of Alexandrian, Casarean, and Byzantine text-types. Westcott and Hort 1881, Westcott and Hort / [NA27 and UBS4 variants] 1864–94, Nestle 1904 (between brackets), Stephanus Textus Receptus 1550, Scrivener's Textus Receptus 1894, RP Byzantine Majority Text 2005, Greek Orthodox Church
omitted – D, a, b, d, e, ff^{2}, l, r^{1}. Tischendorf 8th Edition

Luke 24:40

καὶ τοῦτο εἰπὼν ἔδειξεν αὐτοῖς τὰς χειρᾶς καὶ τοὺς πόδας (and having said thus, [he] showed to them the hands and the feet) – Alexandrian text-type: Westcott and Hort 1881, Westcott and Hort / [NA27 and UBS4 variants] 1864–94, Nestle 1904 (between brackets)
καὶ τοῦτο εἰπὼν ἐπέδειξεν αὐτοῖς τὰς χεῖρας καὶ τοὺς πόδας (and having said thus, [he] showed to them the hands and the feet) – Byz: Stephanus Textus Receptus 1550, Scrivener's Textus Receptus 1894, RP Byzantine Majority Text 2005, Greek Orthodox Church
omitted – D, a, b, d, e, ff^{2}, l, r^{1}, syr^{s}, syr^{cur}. Tischendorf 8th Edition.

Luke 24:42

οἱ δὲ ἐπέδωκαν αὐτῷ ἰχθύος ὀπτοῦ μέρος· (and they gave him a piece of a broiled fish) – Alexandrian text-type: Westcott and Hort 1881, Westcott and Hort / [NA27 and UBS4 variants] 1864–94, Tischendorf 8th Edition, Nestle 1904
Οἱ δὲ ἐπέδωκαν αὐτῷ ἰχθύος ὀπτοῦ μέρος, καὶ ἀπὸ μελισσίου κηρίου. (And they gave him a piece of a broiled fish, and of a honeycomb.) – Byz: Stephanus Textus Receptus 1550, Scrivener's Textus Receptus 1894, RP Byzantine Majority Text 2005, Greek Orthodox Church

Luke 24:46

οὕτως γέγραπται παθεῖν τὸν χριστὸν (thus it is written [that] the Christ/Messiah [would/will] suffer) – Alexandrian text-type: Westcott and Hort 1881, Westcott and Hort / [NA27 and UBS4 variants] 1864–94, Tischendorf 8th Edition, Nestle 1904
Οὕτως γέγραπται, καὶ οὕτως ἔδει παθεῖν τὸν χριστόν, (Thus it is written: And therefore it was necessary for the Christ/Messiah to suffer) – Byz: Stephanus Textus Receptus 1550, Scrivener's Textus Receptus 1894, RP Byzantine Majority Text 2005, Greek Orthodox Church

Luke 24:49

καθίσατε ἐν τῇ πόλει (stay in the city) – Alexandrian text-type: Westcott and Hort 1881, Westcott and Hort / [NA27 and UBS4 variants] 1864–94, Tischendorf 8th Edition, Nestle 1904
καθίσατε ἐν τῇ πόλει Ἱερουσαλήμ (stay in the city of Jerusalem) – Byz: Stephanus Textus Receptus 1550, Scrivener's Textus Receptus 1894, RP Byzantine Majority Text 2005, Greek Orthodox Church

Luke 24:50

ἕως πρὸς Βηθανίαν (as far as the vicinity of Bethany) – Alexandrian text-type
ἔξω ἕως εἰς Βηθανίαν (out as far as to Bethany) – Byz

Luke 24:51

καὶ ἀνεφέρετο εἰς τὸν οὐρανόν (and taken up into heaven), omitted by א*, D, a, b, d, e, ff^{2}, l
hiatus in r^{1}, syr^{s} (syr^{cur}) geo^{1}

Luke 24:52

προσκυνήσαντες αὐτὸν (upon worshiping Him) – omitted by D, a, b, d, e, ff^{2}, l (hiat r^{1}), syr^{s} (syr^{cur}), geo^{2}

Luke 24:53

εὐλογοῦντες τὸν θεόν. ("blessing God.") – Alexandrian text-type: Westcott and Hort 1881, Westcott and Hort / [NA27 and UBS4 variants] 1864–94, Nestle 1904
αἰνουντες τὸν θεόν. ("praising God.") – Western text-type. Tischendorf 8th Edition.
αἰνουντες καὶ εὐλογοῦντες τὸν θεόν. Ἀμήν. ("praising and blessing God. Amen.") – Byz: Stephanus Textus Receptus 1550, Scrivener's Textus Receptus 1894, RP Byzantine Majority Text 2005, Greek Orthodox Church

== Gospel of John ==
5 Textual variants in John 1

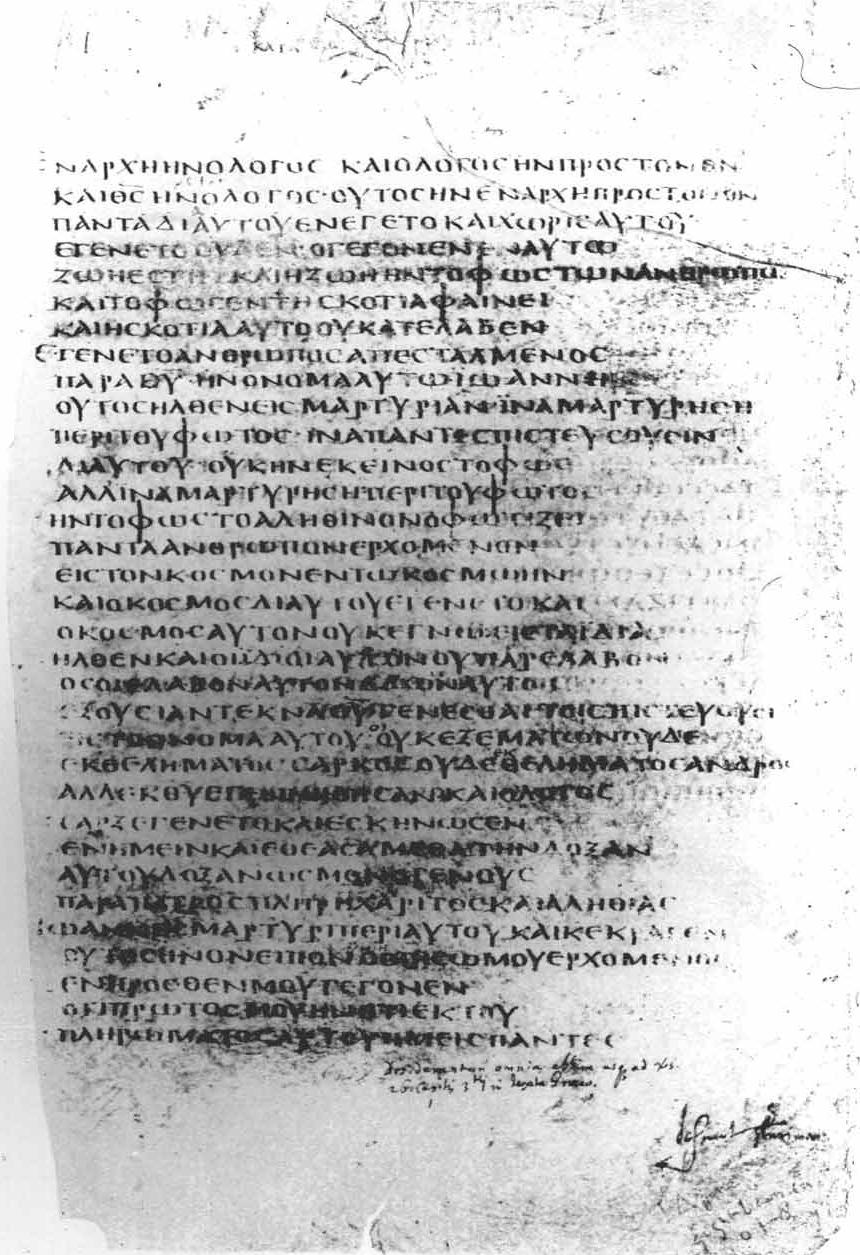
Codex Bezae, text of John 1:1-16

John 1:4

εν αυτῳ ζωη εστιν (in him is life) – א D it vg^{mss} Irenaeus^{lat} Heracleon Clement^{pt} Origen^{pt}
text omitted – W^{supp}
εν αυτῳ ζωη ῃν (in him was life) – All other mss. (rell)

John 1:18

ο μονογενης υιος (the only-begotten son) – A C^{3} K X Δ Θ Π 063 0234 f^{1,13} 28 565 700 892 1009 1010 1071 1079 1195 1216 1230 1241 1242 1253 1344 1365 1546 1646 2148 Byz, syr^{c} Georgian mss. of Adysh (9th century)
ο μονογενης θεος (the only-begotten God) – 𝔓^{75} א^{c} 33 cop^{bo}
μονογενης θεος (God [the] only-begotten) – 𝔓^{66} א* B C* L
ⲠⲚⲞⲨⲦⲈ ⲠϢⲎⲢⲈ ⲚⲞⲨⲰⲦ (only children God) – cop^{sa}

John 1:28

εν Βηθανιᾳ εγενετο – 𝔓^{59}^{vid}, 𝔓^{75}, A, B, C,*, L, W^{supp}, X, Δ, Θ, Ψ, 063, 28, 565, 700, 892*, 1009, 1010, 1071, 1195, 1216, 1241, 1242, 1253, 1344, 1365*, 2148, 2174, Byz, Lect, it, vg, syr
εγενετο εν Βηθανιᾳ – 𝔓^{66}, א*, it^{a, b, e, r^{1}}, cop^{sa}
εν Βηθαβαρᾳ εγενετο – C^{2}, K, Ψ, 083, 0113, f^{1}, f^{13}, 33, 1079, 1230, 1365^{c}, 1546, 1646^{c}, and Byz
εν Βηθαραβᾳ εγενετο – 892, syr^{h^{mg}}, Origen
εγενετο εν Βηθαραβᾳ – א^{2}

John 1:30

υπερ – 𝔓^{5}, 𝔓^{66}, 𝔓^{75}, א* B C* W^{supp}
περι – א^{2} A C^{3} L Θ, Ψ, 063, 0101 f^{1} f^{13} Byz

John 1:34

ο εκλεκτος (the Elect One) – 𝔓^{5} 𝔓^{106}^{vid} 187 218 228 1784 it^{b*, e, ff^{2}} syr^{s, c} Ambrose Augustine
ο εκλεκτος του υιος (the elect Son) – it^{a,ff^{2c}} syr^{pal^{mss}} cop^{sa}
ο υιος (the Son) – rell

1 Textual variants in John 2

John 2:3

οινον ουκ ειχον οτι συνετελεσθη ο οινος του γαμου, ειτα (they did not have wine because the wine of the wedding reception was finished, then) – א* it^{mss} syr^{h^{mg}}
υστερησαντος οινου (they were running short of wine) – rell

3 Textual variants in John 3

John 3:12

πιστευετε (ye believe) – 𝔓^{75} 050 083 579 it^{aur,ff^{2},l} vg^{mss} co^{bo^{mss}}
πιστευσετε (ye will believe) – rell

John 3:16

υιον – 𝔓^{66} 𝔓^{75} א* B W^{supp}
υιον αυτου – rell

John 3:20

τα εργα αυτου – א B Δ 050 063 083 086 28 700 1230 1242^{c} 1253 1365 2148 Byz ℓ^{mss} it cop^{fay} arm geo
αυτου τα εργα – 𝔓^{75}, A, K, W^{supp}, Π, f^{1}, 565, 892*, 1079, 1546,
τα εργα αυτου οτι πονηρα εστιν – 𝔓^{66} Θ f^{13} 33 1009 1010 1071 1195 1216 1242* 1344 1646 2174 it^{r^{1}} cop^{sa,bo,ach^{2}}
τα εργα αυτου πονηρα εστιν οτι – L
τα εργα αυτου οτι πονηρα εισιν – Ψ
αυτου τα εργα οτι πονηρα εισιν – 892^{mg} 1241

5 Textual variants in John 4

John 4:9

ου γαρ συγχρωνται Ιουδαιοι Σαμαριταις (for Jews have no association with Samaritans) omitted by א* D it^{a,b,d, e, j} cop^{fay}

John 4:37

Verse omitted in 𝔓^{75}

John 4:42

ο χριστος (the Christ) – A C^{3} D L X^{supp} Δ Θ Ψ 0141 f^{1,13} 33 565 579 1071 Byz it^{mss} syr^{p,h} cop^{bo^{mss}}
text omitted – 𝔓^{66} 𝔓^{75} א B C* W^{supp} 083^{vid} ℓ^{mss} it^{mss} vg syr^{c} cop^{sa,bo^{mss}} arm Irenaeus^{lat} Origen

John 4:46

ο Ιησους (Jesus) – A Θ Ψ f^{1,13} Byz it^{mss} syr^{p,h} cop^{bo^{mss}}
text omitted – 𝔓^{66} 𝔓^{75} א B C* W^{supp} 086 33 1241 it^{mss} vg syr^{c} cop^{sa,bo^{mss}}

John 4:53

text ο Ιησους omitted – א* N*
ο Ιησους (Jesus) – rell

2 Textual variants in John 5

John 5:2

βηθζαθα – א 33 b 1 ff^{2}
βηλζεθα – D a r^{1}
βηζαθα – L e
βηθεσδα – A C Byz f q TR
βησθεσδα – N
βηθσαιδα – 𝔓^{75} B W 0125 aur c vg bo
βηδσαιδα – 𝔓^{66} sa

John 5:4

Verse omitted by 𝔓^{66} 𝔓^{75} א B C* D T W^{supp} 0141 33 157 821 2718 it^{mss} vg^{mss} syr^{c} co arm geo

2 Textual variants in John 6

John 6:1

της θαλασσης της Γαλιλαιας της Τιβεριαδος – א A B K L W Δ Π Ψ 063 f^{1,13} 28 33 565
της θαλασσης της Γαλιλαιας – 𝔓^{66} 1546
της θαλασσης της Τιβεριαδος – 0210 1242 1344 2174 ℓ 184
της θαλασσης της Γαλιλαιας και της Τιβεριαδος – V it^{f} goth
της θαλασσης της Γαλιλαιας εις τα μερη της Τιβεριαδος – D Θ 892 1009 1230 1253

John 6:4

Verse omitted by 472

2 Textual variants in John 7

John 7:1

ου γαρ ειχεν εξουσιαν (for he did not have authority) – W 196 743 it^{a,b,ff^{2}l,r^{1}} syr^{c} Chrysostom
ου γαρ ηθελεν (for he was not wanting) – All other mss. (rell)

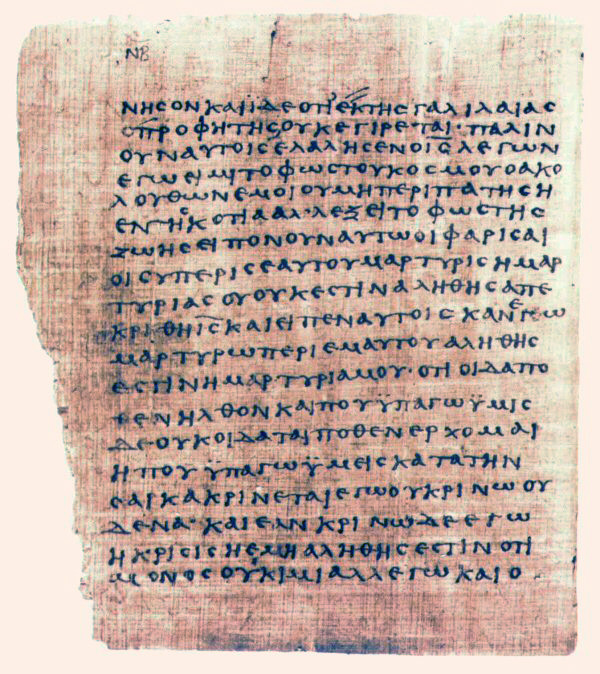
𝔓^{66} lacks John 7:53-8:11

John 7:53-8:11

Include D^{ea}, F^{e}, G^{e}, H^{e}, K^{e}, M, U, Γ, Π, 047, 0233, 28, 318, 700, 892, 1009, 1010, 1071, 1079, 1195, 1216, 1344, 1365, 1546, 1646, 2148, 2174, lat, syr^{pal}, Didascalia, Didymus the Blind, Jerome, Augustine, Apostolic Constitutions
Exclude א, B, 𝔓75, 𝔓66, W, T, N, Ψ, C, A, goth

1 Textual variants in John 8

John 8:8

ενος εκαστου αυτων τας αμαρτιας (the sins of every one of them) – U 73 331 364 658 700 782 1592 it arm
text transposed to John 8:6 – 264

1 Textual variants in John 9

John 9:35

εις τον υιον του ανθρωπου (in the Son of Man) – 𝔓^{66} 𝔓^{75} א Β D W 397 it^{d} syr^{s} co^{sa}
εις τον υιον του θεου (in the Son of God) – A K L X Δ Θ Ψ 070 0141 0250 f^{1,13} 28 33 565 700 Byz ℓ^{mss} it^{mss} vg syr^{p,h,pal} co^{bo} arm goth

1 Textual variants in John 10

John 10:7

η θυρα (door) – majority
ο ποιμην (shepherd) – 𝔓^{75} cop^{sa} cop^{ac}

0 Textual variants in John 11

John 11:1

1 Textual variants in John 12

John 12:28

δοξασον σου το ονομα (glorify thy name) – א A C K W Δ Θ Π Ψ 0250 28 565 700 892 1009 1010 1079 1195 1216 1230 1242 1344 1365 1546 1646 2148 Byz ℓ 69 ℓ 70 ℓ 211 ℓ 1579 ℓ 1761
δοξασον μου το ονομα (glorify my name) – B
δοξασον σου τον υιον (glorify thy son) – L X f^{1,13}33 1071 1241 vg sy^{h mg}, cop^{bo}
δοξασον σου το ονομα εν τη δοξη η ειχον παρα σοι προ του τον κοσμον γενεσται – D it^{d}

1 Textual variants in John 13

John 13:2

Ιουδας Σιμωνος Ισκαριωτου – L Ψ 0124 1241
Ιουδα Σιμωνος απο Καρυωτου – D it^{(d),e}

1 Textual variants in John 14

John 14:14

Verse omitted by X Λ* 0141 f^{1} 565 1009 1365 ℓ 76 ℓ 253 it^{b} vg^{ms} syr^{s,pal} arm geo Diatessaron^{mss}

0 Textual variants in John 15

John 15:1

1 Textual variants in John 16

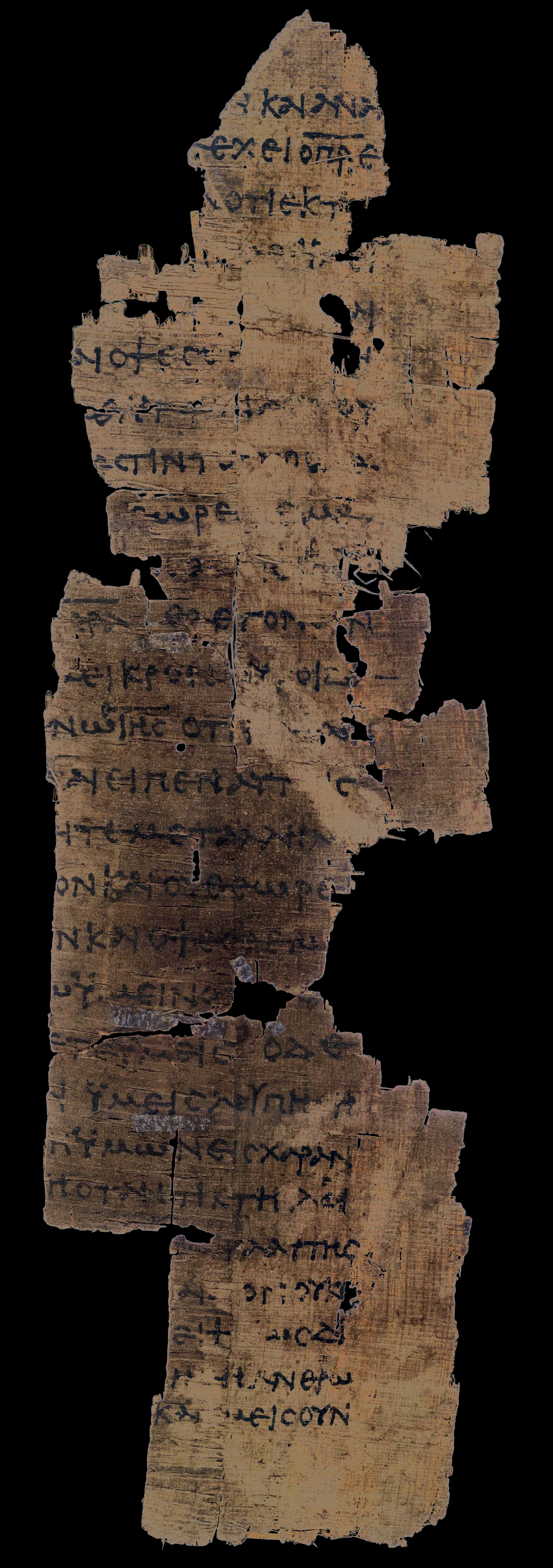
𝔓^{5} with fragment of John 16:22-30

John 16:28

εξηλθον παρα του πατρος (I came forth from the Father) omitted in D W it^{b,d,ff^{2}} syr^{s} cop^{mss}

1 Textual variants in John 17

John 17:14

καθως εγω ουκ ειμι εκ του κοσμου (just as I am not of the world) omitted in 𝔓^{66}* D f^{13} it syr^{s}

3 Textual variants in John 18

John 18:5

ο παραδιδους αυτον (the one betraying him), the phrase is omitted in 𝔓^{66}* syr^{s}

John 18:11

παντες γαρ οι λαβοντες μαχαιραν εν μαχαιρα απολουνται – Θ

John 18:21

ερωτας – א* A B C L W Θ Ψ 054 0250 33 1424 al
επερωτας – D^{s} f^{1} f^{13} Byz

2 Textual variants in John 19

John 19:29

υσσωπω – 𝔓^{66} א^{c} A D^{supp} K L X Π Ψ 054 f^{1} 28 33 565 700 1009 1010 1071 Byz
μετα χολης και υσσωπου – Θ 892^{supp} 1195 2174

John 19:39

μίγμα – 𝔓^{66} א^{c} A D^{supp} K L X Θ Π 054 f^{1} f^{13} 28 33 565 700 1009 1010 1071
ἕλιγμα – א* B W cop^{bo}
σμίγμα – Ψ 892^{supp} 2174 ℓ 47
σμῆγμα – 1242* ℓ 181 syr^{pal}
malagmani – it^{e}

2 Textual variants in John 20

John 20:21

ο Ιησους (Jesus) omitted in א D L W Ψ 050 lat syr^{s} co

John 20:31

ζωην αιωνιον (life eternal) – א C(*) D L Ψ 0100 f^{13} 33 it vg^{mss} syr^{p, h} cop^{sa,bo} Irenaeus^{lat}
ζωην (life) – rell

1 Textual variants in John 21

John 21:7

οι δε ειπον δι οληϲ (τηϲ) νυκτοϲ εκοπιαϲαμεν και (κοπιαϲαντεϲ) ουδεν ελαβομεν επι δε τω ϲω ρηματι (ονοματι) βαλουμεν (and they said: we toiled all night and took nothing, but at your word we will let down) – 𝔓^{66}, א^{1}, Ψ, some mss of Vulgate, cop^{bo}

== Acts of the Apostles ==
9 Textual variants in Acts 1

Acts 1:5

ἐν πνεύματι βαπτισθήσεσθε ἁγίῳ (with [the] Spirit will be baptised Holy) – א* B 81 915 Didymus WH
ἐν πνεύματι ἁγίῳ βαπτισθήσεσθε (with [the] Spirit Holy will be baptised) – D it Hilary Augustine
βαπτισθήσεσθε ἐν πνεύματι ἁγίῳ (will be baptised with [the] Spirit Holy) – 𝔓^{74} א^{c} A C E Ψ Byz vg Origen Cyril ς. Compare Matthew 3:11; Mark 1:8; Luke 3:16.

Acts 1:5

ἡμέρας (days) – Byz ς WH
ἡμέρας ἔως τῆς πεντηκοστῆς (days until the Pentecost) – D, cop^{sa} cop^{mae} Ephraem Augustine Cassiodorus

Acts 1:6

ἠρώτων αὐτὸν (asking [of] him) – WH
ἐπηρώτων αὐτὸν (inquiring him) – Byz ς

Acts 1:7

εἶπεν πρὸς αὐτούς ([he] said to them) – B* syr^{p} WH. Alexandrian text-type: Westcott and Hort 1881, Westcott and Hort / [NA27 and UBS4 variants] 1864–94, Tischendorf 8th Edition, Nestle 1904
εἶπεν δὲ πρὸς αὐτούς (but [he] said to them) – א A B^{2} Ψ Byz vg syr^{h} ς. Byz: Stephanus Textus Receptus 1550, Scrivener's Textus Receptus 1894, RP Byzantine Majority Text 2005, Greek Orthodox Church
καὶ εἶπεν πρὸς αὐτούς (and [he] said to them) – Western text-type: D it
ὁ δὲ ἀποκριθεὶς εἶπεν αὐτοῖς (but he, answering them, said) – (C^{vid}) E

Acts 1:10

ἐσθήσεσι λευκαῖς (white clothing) – 𝔓^{56}^{(c)} א A B C Ψ 81 323 945 1175 1739 pc it vg Eusebius WH
ἐσθήτι λευκῇ (white clothing) – 𝔓^{56}* D E Byz it^{gig} syr ς

Acts 1:11

εἰς τὸν οὐρανόν ((in)to [the] heaven) – א A B C E Ψ 049 056 0142 36 81 88 104 181 307 326^{mg} 330 436 453 610 614 629 630 945 1175 1241 1409 1505 1678 1739^{supp} 1877 1891 2127 2344 2412 2492 Byz Lect it^{ar} it^{c} it^{dem} it^{e} it^{p} it^{ph} it^{ro} it^{t} it^{w} vg syr^{p} syr^{h} syr^{pal} cop^{sa} cop^{bo} cop^{mae} arm^{mss} eth geo slav Origen^{lat} Eusebius Ps-Ignatius Epiphanius Chrysostom Jerome Augustine^{2/6} Cyril Proclus Quodvultdeus^{1/2} Theodoret^{3/4} Cosmas ς WH
omitted – D, 33^{c}, 242, 326* 2495 l^{60} it^{d} it^{gig} vg^{mss} cop^{bo(mss)} arm^{mss} Maximus Maximinus Augustine^{4/6} Quodvultdeus^{1/2} Leo Varimadum Theodoret^{1/4} Vigilius Cassiodorus

Acts 1:14

τῇ προσευχῇ ([in] the prayer) – 𝔓^{74} א A B C* D E Ψ 81 104 1175 pc it vg syr WH NR CEI Riv TILC Nv NM
τῇ προσευχῇ καὶ τῇ δεήσει ([in] the prayer and [in] the supplication) – C Byz ς ND Dio. Compare Philippians 4:6.

Acts 1:15

ἀδελφῶν (of the brothers) – א A B C* 33^{vid} 104 945 1175 pc vg cop^{sa} cop^{bo} WH NR CEI Riv TILC Nv NM
μαθητῶν (of the disciples) – (C) D E Ψ it^{e} it^{gig} it^{p} syr cop^{mae} Byz Cyprian Augustine ς ND Dio.
ἀποστόλων (of the apostles) – 𝔓^{74}

Acts 1:18

πρηνὴς γενόμενος (headlong having fallen/become) – א A B C D E Ψ 049 056 0142 33 81 88 104 181 326 330 436 451 614 629 630 945 1241 1505 1739^{supp} 1877 2127 2412 2492 2495 Byz (syr^{p}) syr^{h} cop^{sa} cop^{bo} ς WH
πρησθείς (swollen up) – geo^{?} Papias
pronus factus ([having been] made/become face down) – it^{d} it^{e} it^{p*}
in faciem prostratus (lying down on the face) – it^{gig} Ambrose
suspensus (hanging/suspended) – it^{ar} it^{c} it^{p(c)} it^{t} vg Bede
(swollen) – arm

2 Textual variants in Acts 2

Acts 2:5

κατοικοῦντες Ἰουδαῖοι, ἄνδρες εὐλαβεῖς – A, B
κατοικοῦντες εν Ἰερουσαλὴμ, ἄνδρες Ἰουδαῖοι – C^{3} (Ἰουδαῖοι ἄνδρες), D (εὐλαβεῖς ἄνδρες), E^{a} (Ἰουδαῖοι κατοικοῦντες), Ψ, 049, 056, 0142, 33, 81, 88, 104, 181, 326, 330, 436, 451, 614, 629, 630, 945, 1241, 1505, 1739, 1877, 2127, 2412, 2492, 2495, Byz, Lect
κατοικοῦντες ἄνδρες εὐλαβεῖς – א, it^{ph}, syr^{p}
κατοικοῦντες Ιουδαιοι – ℓ 603

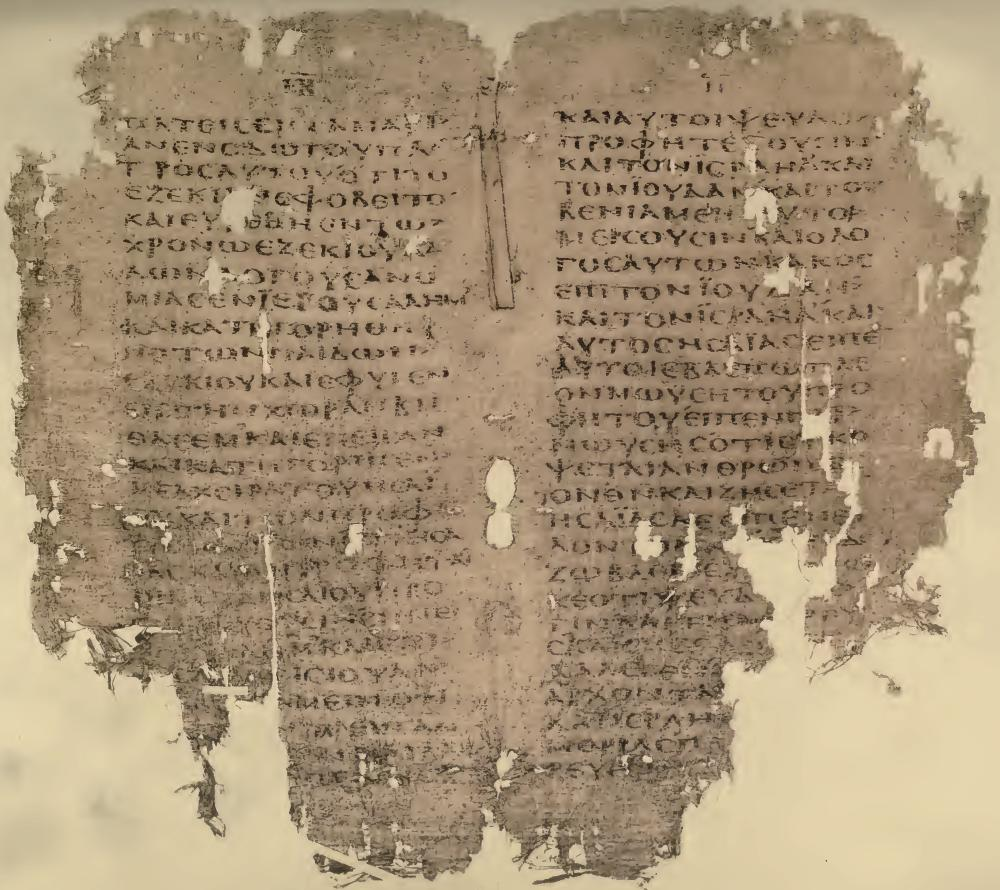
Acts 2:11-22 from Uncial 076

Acts 2:14

ενδεκα – majority
δεκα αποστολος – D*

0 Textual variants in Acts 3

Acts 3:1

2 Textual variants in Acts 4

Acts 4:24

συ – 𝔓^{74}, א, A, B, 2495
συ ει – vg^{cl}
συ ο θεος – D E P Ψ 049 056 0142 104 326 330 436 451 614 629 945 1241 1505 1739 2412 2492 Byz Lect e gig
συ ει ο θεος – 2127, ℓ 680, ℓ 1443, d, cop^{sa}
κυριε ο θεος – 33, 181, 1877, syr^{p, h}
κυριε συ – 88 (arm συ κυριος)
κυριε – ar

Acts 4:36

Ἰωσὴφ (Joseph) – Westcott and Hort 1881, Westcott and Hort / [NA27 and UBS4 variants], Tischendorf's 8th Edition 1864–94, Nestle 1904
Ἰωσῆς (Joses) – Stephanus Textus Receptus 1550, Scrivener's Textus Receptus 1894, RP Byzantine Majority Text 2005, Greek Orthodox Church

2 Textual variants in Acts 5

Acts 5:3

ὁ Πέτρος Ἁνανία – majority of manuscripts of all the Alexandrian, Caesarean, and Byzantine text-types
Πέτρος πρὸς Ἁνανίαν – D, Ψ
πρὸς αὐτόν ὁ Πέτρος Ἁνανίαν – E, 321

Acts 5:28

ου παραγγελια – א^{c}, D^{gr}, E, P, (Ψ ουχι), 049, 056, 0142, 88, 104, 181, 326, 330, 436, 451, 614, 629, 630, 945, 1241, 1505, 1739, 1877, 2127, 2412, 2492, 2495, Byz, Lect, e, h, p, syr^{p, h}, cop^{sa}, arm, eth
παραγγελια – 𝔓^{74}, א*, A, B, ℓ 147, ar, d, gig, vg, cop^{sa}

0 Textual variants in Acts 6

Acts 6:1

0 Textual variants in Acts 7

Acts 7:1

2 Textual variants in Acts 8

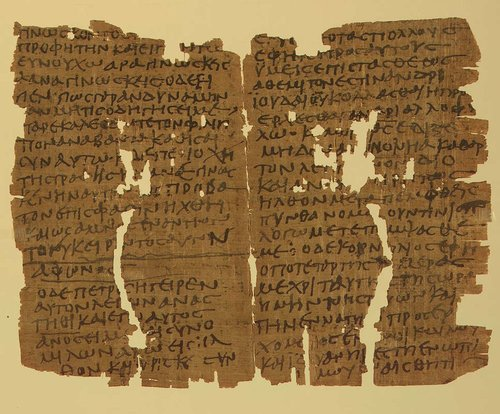
Act 8:26-32 from 𝔓^{50}

Acts 8:37

εἶπε δὲ ὁ Φίλιππος, εἰ πιστεύεις ἐξ ὅλης τῆς καρδίας, ἔξεστιν ἀποκριθεὶς δὲ ειπε, πιστεύω τὸν υἱὸν του θεου ειναι τὸν Ιησουν Χριστον – 104, 323, 453, 945, 1739, 1891, 2818, ℓ 59
εἶπε δὲ αὐτῷ ὁ Φίλιππος, ἐὰν πιστεύεις ἐξ ὅλης τῆς καρδίας σου, σωθήσει ἀποκριθεὶς δὲ ειπε, πιστεύω εἰς τὸν Χριστὸν τὸν υἱὸν του θεου – Ε^{a}, it^{e}
εἶπε δὲ, εἰ πιστεύεις ἐξ ὅλης τῆς καρδίας, ἔξεστιν ἀποκριθεὶς δὲ ὁ εὐνοῦχος ειπεν αὐτῷ, πιστεύω τὸν υἱὸν του θεου ειναι τὸν Ιησουν Χριστον – 88
verse omitted by 𝔓^{45}, 𝔓^{74}, א, A, B, C, P, Ψ, 049, 056, 0142, 33, 81, 88*, 104, 181, 326, 330, 436, 451, 614, 1241, 1505, 2127, 2412, 2492, 2495, Byz, Lect

Acts 8:39

πνεῦμα ἅγιον ἐπέπεσεν ἐπὶ τὸν εὐνοῦχον, ἄγγελος δέ κύριου ἥρπασεν τὸν Φίλιππον (the Holy Spirit fell on the eunuch, and an angel of the Lord caught up Philip) – A, 36^{a}, 94, 103, 307, 322, 323, 385, 453, 467, 945, 1739, 1765, 1891, 2298, it^{p}, vg, syr^{h}

0 Textual variants in Acts 9

Acts 9:1

1 Textual variants in Acts 10

Acts 10:25

Codex Bezae has an addition: "And as Peter was drawing near to Caesarea one of the servants ran forward and announced that he was come."

1 Textual variants in Acts 11

Acts 11:20

Ελληνιστας – B D^{b} E P Ψ 049 056 0142 81 88 104 181 326 330 436 451 614 629 630 945 1241 1505 1739 1877 2127 2412 2492 2495 Byz Lect
Ελληνας – 𝔓^{74} Sinaiticus^{c}, A D arm
ευαγγελιστας – Sinaiticus

1 Textual variants in Acts 12

Acts 12:25

εις Ιερουσαλημ (to Jerusalem) – א, B, H, L, P, 049, 056, 0142, 81, 88, 326, 330, 451, 629, 1241, 1505, 1877, 2492, 2495, Byz, Lect
εξ Ιερουσαλημ (from Jerusalem) – 𝔓^{74}, A, 33, 69, 630, 2127
απο Ιερουσαλημ (from Jerusalem) – D, Ψ, 181, 436, 614, 2412, ℓ 147, ℓ 809, ℓ 1021, ℓ 1141, ℓ 1364, ℓ 1439, ar, d, gig, vg, Chrysostom
εις Αντιοχειαν (to Antioch) – 97^{mg}, 110, 328, 424^{mg}, 425^{c}
εις την Αντιοχειαν (to Antioch) – ℓ 38
απο Ιερουσαλημ εις Αντιοχειαν (from Jerusalem to Antioch) – E, 322, 323
εξ Ιερουσαλημ εις Αντιοχειαν (from Jerusalem to Antioch) – 429, 945, 1739, e, p, syr^{p}, cop^{sa} geo
εις Ιερουσαλημ εις Αντιοχειαν (to Jerusalem to Antioch) – 104, cop^{sa} (some mss.)

1 Textual variants in Acts 13

Acts 13:33

εν τω ψαλμω γεγραπται τω δευτερω (it is written in the second Psalm) – 𝔓^{75}, א, A, B, C, Ψ, 33 81 181 326 630 945 1739
εν τω ψαλμω τω δευτερω γεγραπται (it is written in the second Psalm) – Ε Π 049 88 104 330 436 451 614 629 1241 1505 1877 2127 2412 2492 2495 Byz
εν τω δευτερω ψαλμω γεγραπται (it is written in the second Psalm) – 056 0142
εν τω πρωτω ψαλμω γεγραπται (it is written in the first Psalm) – D* it
εν τοις ψαλμοις γεγραπται (it is written in Psalms) – 𝔓^{45}
εν τω ψαλμω γεγραπται (it is written in Psalm) – 522 1175

0 Textual variants in Acts 14

Acts 14:1

3 Textual variants in Acts 15

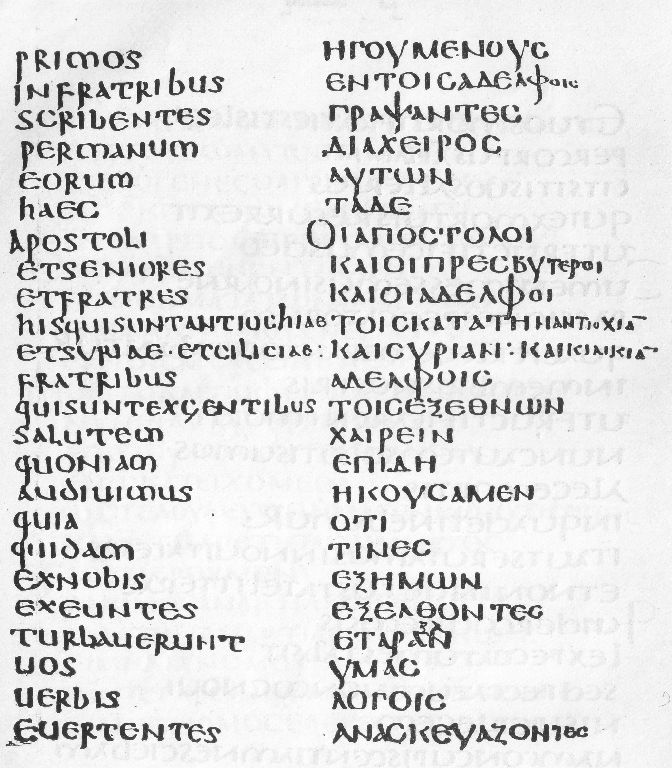
Acts 15:22–24 from the Codex Laudianus, written in parallel columns of Latin and Greek.

Acts 15:23

γραψαντης δια χειρος αυτων – 𝔓^{45}, 𝔓^{74}, א*, A, B, cop^{bo}
γραψαντης δια χειρος αυτων ταδε – א^{c}, E, (33), Byz, syr^{h}
γραψαντης δια χειρος αυτων επιστολην περιεχουσαν ταδε – C, ar, c, gig, w, geo
γραψαντης επιστολην δια χειρος αυτων περιεχουσαν ταδε – D, d
γραψαντης επιστολην δια χειρος αυτων εχουσαν τον τυπον τουτον – Ψ
γραψαντης δια χειρος αυτων επιστολην και πεμψαντες περιεχουσαν ταδε – 614.

Acts 15:24

ψυχας υμων (your souls) – 𝔓^{33}, 𝔓^{45}, 𝔓^{74}, א, A, B, D, 33, 81, 629
ψυχας υμων λεγοντες περιτεμνεσθαι και τηρειν τον νομον (your souls, saying: you must be circumcised and keep the law) – C, E^{a} (περιτεμνεσθαι δει), P, Ψ, 049, 056, 0142, 88, 104, 181, 326, 330, 436, 451, 614, 630, 945, 1241, 1739, Byz

Acts 15:34

verse omitted by majority of the mss.
verse contained in C, 33, 88, 181, 326, 436, 614, 630, 945, 1739, 2412

0 Textual variants in Acts 16

Acts 16:1

1 Textual variants in Acts 17

Acts 17:26

εξ ενος – 𝔓^{74}, א, A, B, 33, 81, 181, 629, 630, 1739, vg, cop^{sa, bo}
εξ ενος αιματος – D, E, P, 049, 056, 0142, 88, 104, 326, 330, 436, 451, 614, 945, 1241, 1505, 1877, 2127, 2412, 2492, 2495, Byz Lect
εξ ενος στοματος – Ψ, ℓ 603
omitted by eth^{ro}

1 Textual variants in Acts 18

Acts 18:26

την οδον – D d gig
την οδον του θεου – 𝔓^{74} א A B 33 88 181 326 436 614 2412 ℓ 60 ℓ 1356
την οδον του κυριου – E 1505 2495 ℓ 598
τον λογον του κυριου – 945 1739
τον λογον του θεου – 630
την του θεου οδον – P Ψ 049 0142 104 330 451 1241 1877 2127 2492 Byz Lect

1 Textual variants in Acts 19

Acts 19:20

του κυριου ο λογος – א A B
ο λογος του κυριου – majority
η πιστις του κυριου – D, syr^{p}

2 Textual variants in Acts 20

Acts 20:15

και μειναντες εν Τρωγυλλιω (and after remaining at Trogyllium) – D P 049 88 181 326 330 451 614 945 1241 1505 1877 2127 2412 2492 2495
και μειναντες εν Στρογγυλιω (and after remaining at Strogyllium) – 056 0142
και μειναντες εν Στογυλιω (and after remaining at Stogyllium) – 104
μεινοντες εις το Γυλλιον (Gyllium) – Ψ
omit – 𝔓^{74} א A B C E^{gr} 33 630 1739

Acts 20:28

εκκλησιαν του Θεου (church of God) – א B 614 1175 2495 al vg sy bo^{ms}
εκκλησιαν του κυριου (church of the Lord) – 𝔓^{74}, A, C*, D, E, Ψ, 33, 453, 945, 1739, 1891, 36^{a}
εκκλησιαν του κυριου και του Θεου (church of the Lord and God) – C^{3}, Byz

1 Textual variants in Acts 21

Acts 21:1

Παταρα – א B E P Ψ 049 056 0142 33 88 104 181 326 330 436 451 614 629 630 945 1241 1505 1739 1877 2127 2412 2492 2495 Byz ar e vg syr^{p, h} cop^{bo} arm eth
Πατερα – 𝔓^{74} A C
Παταρα και Μυρα – 𝔓^{41} D^{gr} gig (it^{ph} Hyram) vg^{mss} cop^{sa}

0 Textual variants in Acts 22

Acts 22:1

2 Textual variants in Acts 23

Acts 23:1

2 Textual variants in Acts 24

Acts 24:6b-8a

verse omitted by majority of the mss.
verse contained (with textual differences) in E, Ψ, 056, 0142, 33, 88, 181, 424, 436, 483, 614, 630, 945, 1505, 2412, 2495

Acts 24:20

ευρον αδικημα – 𝔓^{74} א A B 33 81 181
ευρον εν εμοι αδικημα – C E P Ψ 049 056 0142 88 104 326 330 436 451 614 629 Byz

0 Textual variants in Acts 25

Acts 25:1

0 Textual variants in Acts 26

Acts 26:1

3 Textual variants in Acts 27

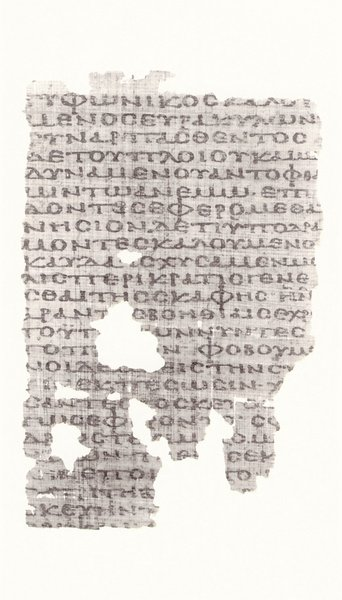
𝔓^{74} with text Acts 27:14-21

Acts 27:16

Καυδα (name of island) – 𝔓^{74} B 1175 lat syr^{p}
Κλαυδα – א A 33 81 614 945 1739 2495, vg^{mss} (Codex Cavensis) syr^{h}
Κλαυδην – Byz
Γαυδην – Ψ

Acts 27:37

ως εβδομηκοντα (about seventy) – Epiphanius^{pt}
ως εβδομηκοντα εξ (about seventy-six) – B sa Epiphanius^{pt}
εβδομηκοντα εξ (seventy-six) – 522 ℓ^{680}
εκατον εβδομηκοντα εξ (one hundred seventy-six) – bo^{mss}
διακοσιοι δεκα εξ (two hundred sixteen) – ℓ^{1156}
διακοσιαι εβδομηκοντα (two hundred seventy) – 69 Ephraem
διακοσιαι εβδομηκοντα πεντε (two hundred seventy-five) – A sa
διακοσιαι εβδομηκοντα εξ (two hundred seventy-six) – rell

Acts 27:41

απο της βιας (from the force) – א*
υπο της βιας (by the force) – A B arm geo
a vi maris (from the sea) – latt
των κυματων (of the waves) – ℓ^{1441} (w/obeli)
υπο των κυματων (by the waves) – Ψ 1678 2464 eth
υπο της βιας των ανεμων (by the force of the winds) – 629
απο της βιας των κυματων (from the force of the waves) – 104 ℓ^{599}
υπο της βιας των κυματων (by the force of the waves) – 𝔓^{74} א^{2} rell

0 Textual variants in Acts 28

Acts 28:1

== Epistle to the Romans ==
4 Textual variants in Romans 1

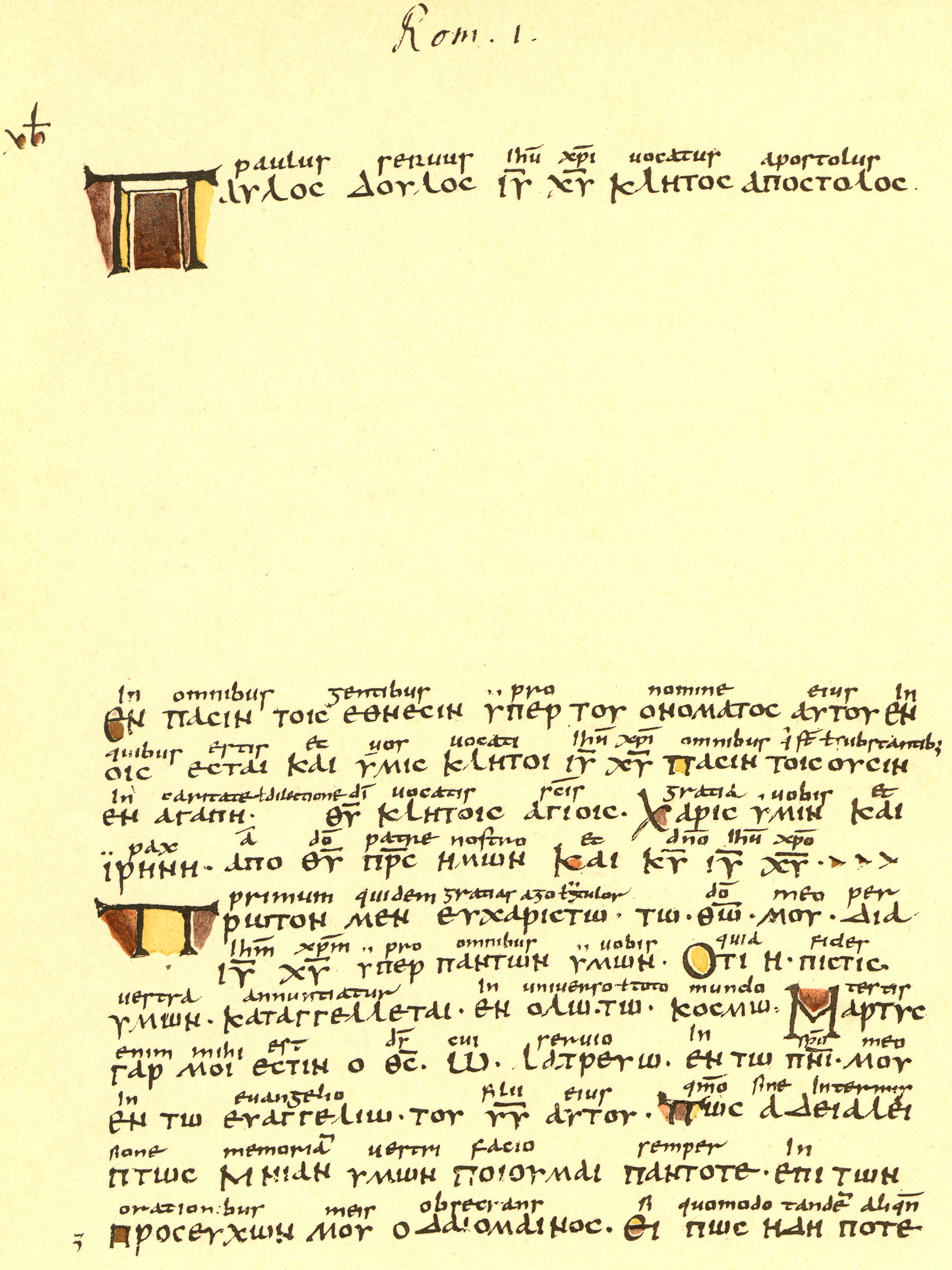
First page of the Codex Boernerianus; in Romans 1:7 "in Rome" replaced into "in love"

Romans 1:7

ἐν Ῥώμῃ (in Rome) – א A B C D K P Ψ 33 81 88 104 181 330 436 451 614 629 630 1241 1739^{txt} 1877 1881 1962 1984 1985 2127 2492 2495 Byz Lect it vg syr cop arm Origen Ambst. Augustine
ἐν ἀγάπῃ θεοῦ (in love of God) – Codex Boernerianus
omitted by 1739^{mg} 1908 Origen

Romans 1:8

περι – א A B C D* K 33 81 1506 1739 1881
υπερ – D^{c} G Ψ Byz

Romans 1:15

ἐν Ῥώμῃ – omitted by G^{a}

Romans 1:29

πονηρια πλεονεξια κακια – B 0172^{vid} 1739 1881 Origen Basil
πονηρια κακια πλεονεξια – א A cop^{bo^{mss}}
κακια πονηρια πλεονεξια – C D^{supp.c} 33 81 cop^{sa, bo} eth
κακια πορνεια πλεονεξια – D^{supp.*} G (629 add πονηρια) it^{d, e, g}
πορνεια πονηρια πλεονεξια κακια – L Ψ (88 add και after each word) 326 330 436 451 614 630 1241 1877 1962 1984 1985 2127 2492 2495 Byz Lect syr^{h} arm
πορνεια αδικια πλεονεξια κακια – 181
πονηρια πορνεια πλεονεξια κακια – 104 vg?
και πορνεια πλεονεξια κακια – P
πλεονεξια κακια – K

0 Textual variants in Romans 2

Romans 2:1

1 Textual variants in Romans 3

Romans 3:26

Ἰησοῦ – א, A, B, C, K, P, 81, 88, 104, 181, 630, 1241, 1739, 1881, 1877, 1962, 2495, Byz, ℓ 598, ℓ 599, ℓ 603
Ἰησοῦν – D, Ψ, 33, 326, 330, 436, 451, 614, 1985, 2127, 2492
Ἰησοῦν Χριστόν – 1984
Ἰησοῦ Χριστοῦ – 629
κυρίου ἡμῶν Ἰησοῦ Χριστοῦ – syr^{p}
omit F, G, 336, it

0 Textual variants in Romans 4

Romans 4:1

0 Textual variants in Romans 5

Romans 5:1

3 Textual variants in Romans 6

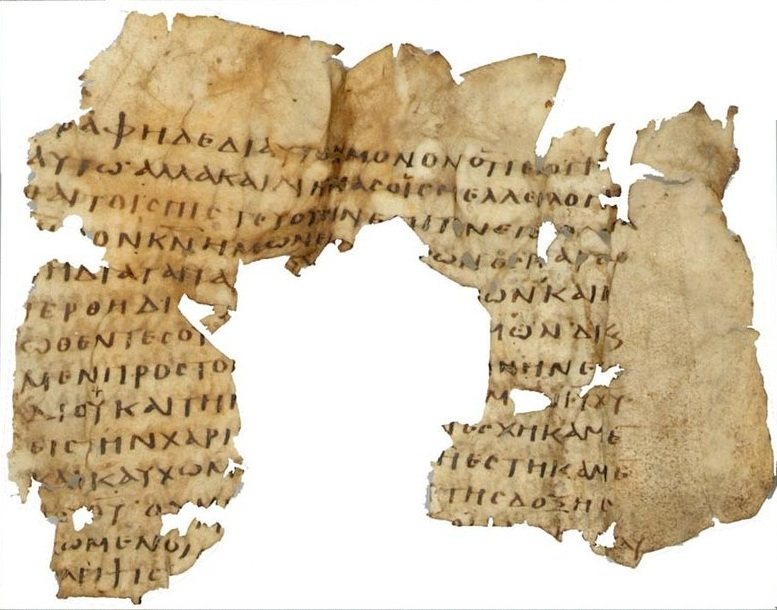
Romans 4:23-5:3 in Uncial 0220

Romans 6:11

ἐν Χριστῷ Ἰησοῦ – 𝔓^{46}, A, B, D, G, Ψ, 629, 630, 1739, it, vg
ἐν Χριστῷ Ἰησοῦ τῷ κυριῷ ἡμῶν – א, C, K, P, 33, 81, 88, 181, 326, 330, 436, 451, 614, 1241, 1739, 1877, 1881, 1962, 1984, 1985, 2127, 2492, 2495, Byz, Lect
ἐν Χριστῷ τῷ κυριῷ ἡμῶν – 104
omit it^{r}

Romans 6:16

εἰς θάνατον (for death) – omitted by D, 1739*, d, r, am, pesh, sa, arm^{mss}, Ambrosiaster

Romans 6:17

καρδιας – majority of mss
καθαρας – A

0 Textual variants in Romans 7

Romans 7

1 Textual variants in Romans 8

Romans 8:1

Ιησου – א, B, D, G, 1739, 1881, it^{d, g}, cop^{sa, bo}, eth
Ιησου μη κατα σαρκα περιπατουσιν – A, D^{b}, Ψ, 81, 629, 2127, vg
Ιησου μη κατα σαρκα περιπατουσιν αλλα κατα πνευμα – א^{c}, D^{c}, K, P, 33, 88, 104, 181, 326, 330, (436 omit μη), 456, 614, 630, 1241, 1877, 1962, 1984, 1985, 2492, 2495, Byz, Lect

1 Textual variants in Romans 9

Romans 9:11

κακον – 𝔓^{46}, D, F, G, Ψ, Byz
φαυλον – א, B, C, 6, 81, 365, 630, 945, 1506, 1739, 1881, al

1 Textual variants in Romans 10

Romans 10:21

καὶ ἀντιλέγοντα (and contrary) – omitted by F, G, g, Ambrosiaster, Hilary

1 Textual variants in Romans 11

Romans 11:1

τὸν λαόν – א, A, Β, C, D, K, P, Ψ, 33, 81, 88, 181, 330, 436, 451, 614, 629, 630, 1241, 1739, 1877, 1881, 1962, 1984, 1985, 2127, 2492, 2495, Byz, Lect, it^{ar, d, dem, e, z}, vg, syr^{p, h}, cop^{sa, bo}, arm, Origen, Eusebius, Chryzostom, Augustine, Theodoret
τὴν κληρονομίαν – 𝔓^{46}, G, it, goth, Ambrosiaster, Ambrose, Pelagius

2 Textual variants in Romans 12

Romans 12:9

ἀποστυγοῦντες τὸ πονηρόν – F, G, lat, syr replaced into μισουντες το πονηρον

Romans 12:11

κυριω – 𝔓^{46} א Α Β D^{b,c} P Ψ 33 81 88 104 181 326 330 436 451 614 629 630 1241 1739 1877 1881 1962 1984 1985 2127 2492 2495 Byz
καιρω – D* F G 5

2 Textual variants in Romans 13

Romans 13:1

υπο θεου – א Α Β D^{2} Ψ Byz
απο θεου – D* F G 629 945

Romans 13:9

ου ψευδομαρτυρησεις, ουκ επιθυμησεις – 01 048 81 88 104 326 330 365 436 451 629 1506 1962 1984 2127 2492 2495 Byz^{pt} ℓ 597 ℓ 598 ℓ 599 a b vg^{cl} (syr^{h}) cop^{bo}
ου ψευδομαρτυρησης, ουκ επιθυμησης – P
ουκ επιθυμησεις – 𝔓^{46} Α Β D F G L Ψ 6 33 181 614 630 1175 1241 1739 1877 1881 vgst syr^{p} cop^{sa}
ουκ επιθυμησεις, ου ψευδομαρτυρησεις – 2495

0 Textual variants in Romans 14

Romans 14:1

3 Textual variants in Romans 15

Romans 15:19

πνευματος θεου – 𝔓^{46} א D P Ψ 88 181 326 436 614 629 1241
πνευματος αγιου – A D G 33 81 104 630 1739
πνευματος θεου αγιου – 330 451

Romans 15:29

Χριστου – 𝔓^{46} א Α Β C D G P 81 629 630 1739 1881 ar d e f g x z vg^{ww} cop arm
του ευαγγελιου του Χριστου – א^{c} Ψ 33 88 104 181 326 330 436 451 614 1241 1877 1962 1984 2127 2492 2495 Byz Lect vg^{cl} syr^{p,h}
της διδαχης του Χριστου – eth^{ro}

Romans 15:31

διακονια – 𝔓^{46} א Α C D^{c} P Ψ 33 81 88 104 181 326 330 436 451 614 629 630 1241 1739 1877 1881 1962 1984 1985 2127 2492 2495 Byz Lect
δωροφορια – B D G^{gr}

4 Textual variants in Romans 16

Romans 16:15

Ιουλιαν, Νηρεα – א Α Β C^{2} D P Ψ 33 81 88 104 181 326 330 436 451 614 629 630 1241 1739 1877 1881 1962 1984 1985 2127 2492 2495 Byz Lect it vg syr cop arm
Βηρεα και Αουλιαν – 𝔓^{46}
Ιουνιαν, Νηρεα – C G^{gr}

Romans 16:20

ἡ χάρις τοῦ κυρίου ἡμῶν Ἰησοῦ (Χριστου) μεθ' ὑμῶν (The grace of our Lord Jesus (Christ) with you) – mss of the Alexandrian, Caesarean, and Byzantine text-types
omitted by D*^{vid}, F^{p}, G, d, f, g, m, bodl Ambrosiaster Pelagius^{ms}

Romans 16:24

Verse omitted by Codex Sinaiticus A B C 5 81 263 623 1739 1838 1962 2127 it^{z} vg^{ww} cop^{sa,bo} eth^{ro} Origen^{lat})
Verse included by D G Ψ 88 181 326 330 451 614 629 630 1241 1877 1881 1984 1985 2492 2495 Byz Lect it vg^{cl} syr^{h}
Verse included but following 16:27 P 33 104 256 436 1319 1837 syr^{p} arm

Romans 16:25-27

verses omitted by F, G, 629, d**?, g, goth?, Jerome^{mss}

== First Epistle to the Corinthians ==
1 Textual variants in 1 Corinthians 1

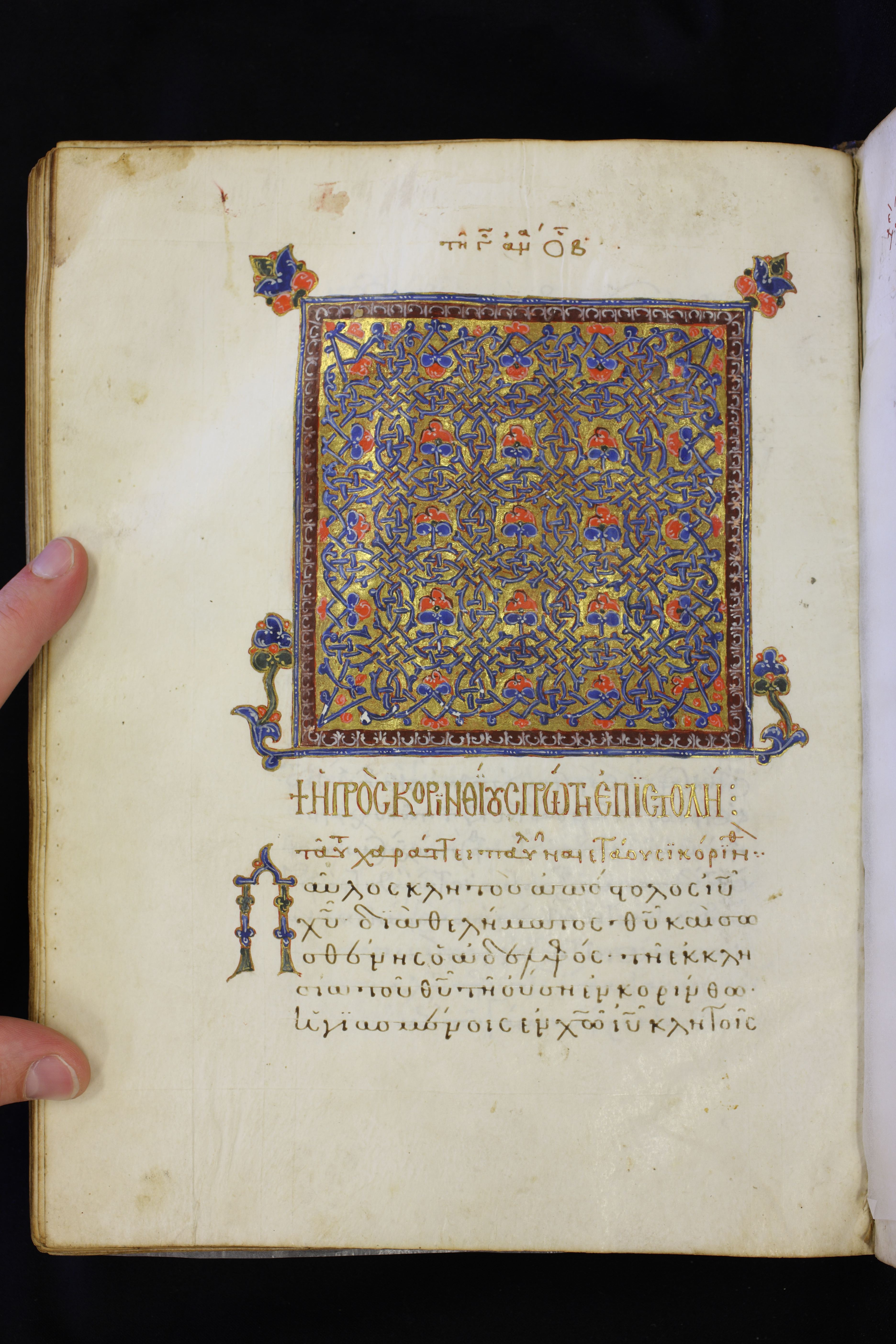
The first page of 1 Corinthians in Minuscule 223 (14th century)

1 Corinthians 1:8

ημερα – majority
παρουσια – D F G

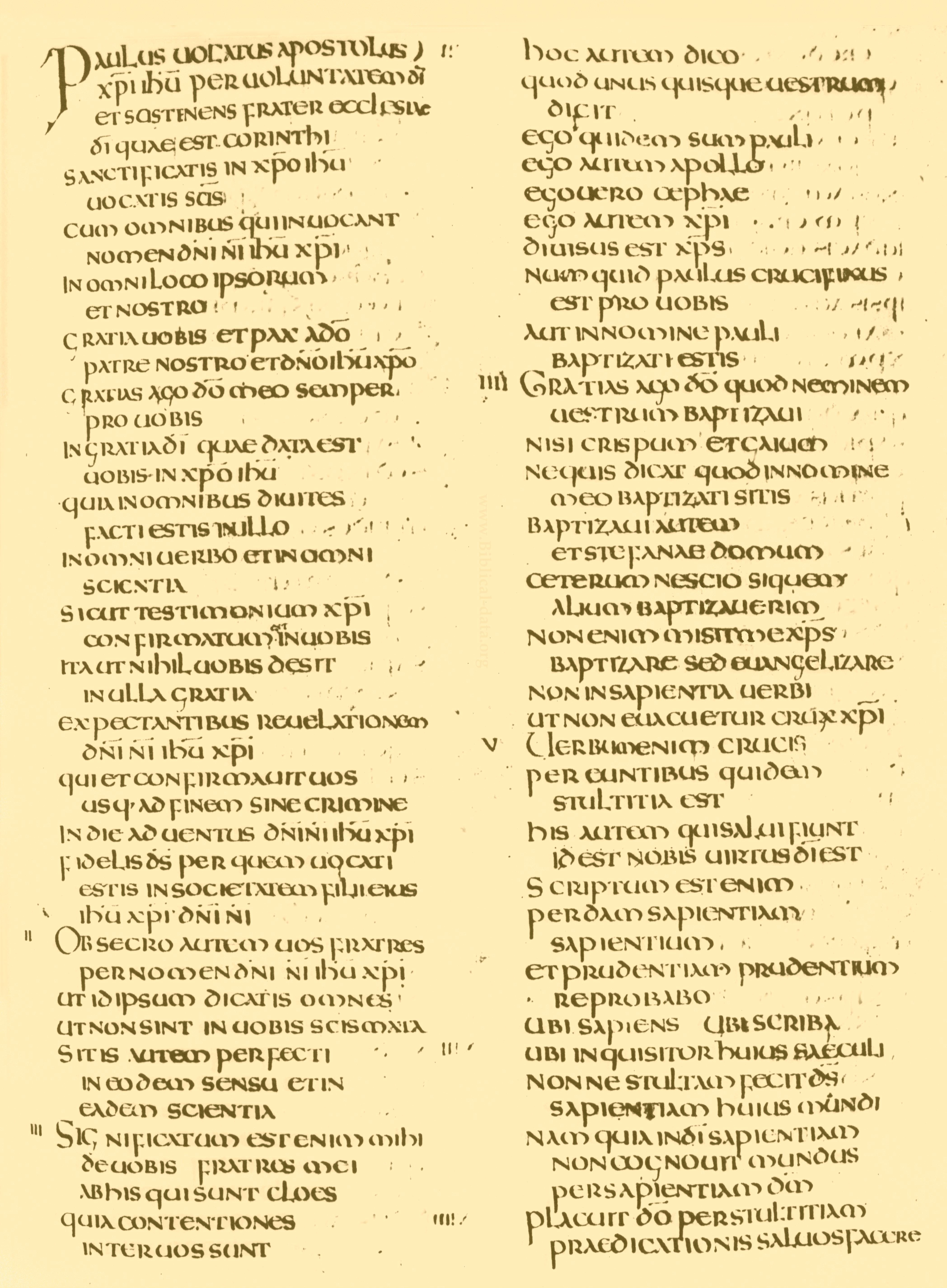
Codex Amiatinus (~700 CE) with text of 1 Corinthians 1:1-21

3 Textual variants in 1 Corinthians 2

1 Corinthians 2:1

μυστηριον – 𝔓^{46}, א, Α, C, 88, 436, it^{a,r}, syr^{p}, cop^{bo}
μαρτυριον – B D G P Ψ 33 81 104 181 326 330 451 614 629 630 1241 1739 1877 1881 1962 1984 2127 2492 2495 Byz Lect it vg syr^{h} cop^{sa} arm eth
ευαγγελιον – Theodoret
σωτηριον – 489, ℓ 598^{pt}, ℓ 599

1 Corinthians 2:4

πειθοις σοφιας λογοις (plausible words of wisdom) – (א λογος) B (D^{gr} 33 πιθοις) D^{c} 181 1739 1877 1881 it^{r1} vg^{ww} eth
πειθοις σοφιας (plausible wisdom) – 𝔓^{46} G^{gr}
πειθοι σοφιας (plausible wisdom) – 35 it^{f,g}
πειθοις ανθρωπινης σοφιας λογοις – C Ψ (A P 326 330 πιθοις) 81 88 104 436 451 614 629 1241 1984 2127 2492 Byz vg^{cl} syr^{h} cop^{bo}
πειθοις ανθρωπινης σοφιας – 630
πειθοις ανθρωπινης σοφιας και λογοις – 131

1 Corinthians 2:14

του θεου – 𝔓^{11}, 𝔓^{46}, א, A, B, C, D, G, P, Ψ, 33, 81, 88, 104, 181, 326, 436, 614, 629, 630, 1241, 1739, 1877, 1881, 1962, 1985, 2127, 2492, 2495, Byz, Lect, it, vg, syr^{h}, cop, arm
αγιου – eth
omitted by 2 216 255 330 440 451 823 1827 syr^{p}

2 Textual variants in 1 Corinthians 3

1 Corinthians 3:3

ἔρις – 𝔓^{11}, א, B, C, P, Ψ, 81, 181, 630, 1739, 1877, 1881, it, vg
ἔρεις – A
ἔρις διχοστασία – 623, Chrysostom
ἔρις καί διχοστασίαι – 𝔓^{46}, D, 33, 88, 104, 181, 326, 330, 436, 451, 614, 629, 1241, 1984, 1985, 2127, 2492, 2495, Byz, Lect
ἔρις καί ἀρχοστασία – 1962
ἔρεις καί διχοστασίαι – G^{a}

1 Corinthians 3:4

ουκ ανθρωποι – 𝔓^{46}, Sinaiticus, Alexandrinus, Vaticanus, Ephraemi, 33, 81, 1175, 1506, 1739, 1881;
ουχι σαρκικοι – Sinaiticus^{2}, Ψ, and the Byzantine manuscripts read;
ουχι ανθρωποι – D F G 629;

0 Textual variants in 1 Corinthians 4

1 Corinthians 4:1

1 Textual variants in 1 Corinthians 5

1 Corinthians 5:5

κυρίου – 𝔓^{46}, B, 630, 1739, Marcion , Tertulian, Origen
κυρίου Ἰησοῦ – א, Ψ, 81, 181, 326, 614, 1877, 1985, 2492, 2495, Byz, Lect
κυρίου Ἰησοῦ Χριστοῦ – D, 1984
Ἰησοῦ Χριστοῦ – 629
κυρίου ἡμῶν Ἰησοῦ – 048, cop^{bo}, eth
κυρίου ἡμῶν Ἰησοῦ Χριστοῦ – A, F, G, P, 33, 88, 104, 330, 436, 451, 629, 241, 1881, 1962, 2127, it, vg, syr^{p, h}, cop^{sa, bo}, arm, Origen

0 Textual variants in 1 Corinthians 6

1 Corinthians 6:1

2 Textual variants in 1 Corinthians 7

1 Corinthians 7:5

τη προσευχη (prayer) – 𝔓^{11}, 𝔓^{46}, א*, A, B, C, D, F, G, P, Ψ, 33, 81, 104, 181, 629, 630, 1739, 1877, 1881, 1962, it vg, cop, arm, eth
τη νηστεια και τη προσευχη (fasting and prayer) – א^{c}, K, L, 88, 326, 436, 614, 1241, 1984, 1985, 2127, 2492, 2495, Byz, Lect, syr^{p,h}, goth
τη προσευχη και νηστεια (prayer and fasting) – 330, 451, John of Damascus

1 Corinthians 7:14

αδελφω – 𝔓^{46}, א*, A, B, C, D, F, G, P, Ψ, 33, 181, 1739, 1877, 1962, d, e, f, g, cop
ανδρι – א^{c}, D^{c}, K, L, 81, 88, 104, 326, 330, 436, 451, 614, 630, 1241, 1881, 1984, 1985, 2127, 2492, 2495, Byz, Lect, syr^{h}, goth, arm, eth
ανδρι τω πιστω – 629 it

0 Textual variants in 1 Corinthians 8

1 Corinthians 8:1

1 Textual variants in 1 Corinthians 9

1 Corinthians 9:20

μη ων αυτος υπο νομον (being not himself under the law) – omitted by D^{2} K (L) Ψ 81 88 326 330 424 451 460 614 629^{c} 1241 1518 1852 1881 1984 1985 2138 2464 2492 Byz Lect syr^{p} eth geo slav Origen^{pt} Nestorius Theodoret

1 Textual variants in 1 Corinthians 10

1 Corinthians 10:9

Χριστον – 𝔓^{46} D G K Ψ 88 330 451 614 629 630 1241 1739 1881 1984 2492 2495 Byz Lect
κυριον – א, B, C, P, 33, 104, 181, 326, 436, 1877, 2127
θεον – A, 81
omit by 1985

1 Textual variants in 1 Corinthians 11

1 Corinthians 11:24

υμων – 𝔓^{46}, א*, A, B, C*, 33, 1739, arm
υμων κλωμενον – א^{c}, C^{3}, D^{b,c}, G, K, Ψ, 81, 88, 104, 181, 326, 330, 436, 451, 614, 629, 630, 1241, 1739^{mg}, 1877, 1881, 1962, 1984, 1985, 2127, 2492, 2495, Byz, Lect
υμων θρυπτομενον – D^{gr}
υμων διδομενον – c, dem, f, t, x, z^{c}, vg (tradetur), cop, eth

1 Textual variants in 1 Corinthians 12

1 Corinthians 12:9

χαρισματα ιαματων εν τω ενι πνευματι – A B 33 81 104 436 630 1881 it vg
χαρισματα ιαματων εν πνευματι – 1739
χαρισματα ιαματων εν τω αυτω πνευματι – א C^{3} D G K P 0201 88 181 330 451 614 629 1241 1877 1962 1984 1985 2127 2492 2495 Byz Lect
χαρισματα ιαματων εν τω πνευματι – 𝔓^{46}
χαρισματα ιαματων – C
χαρισματα – Ψ

4 Textual variants in 1 Corinthians 13

1 Corinthians 13:2

κἂν ἐὰν ἔχω προφητείαν – Westcott and Hort / [NA27 and UBS4 variants]
κἂν ἔχω προφητείαν – Westcott and Hort 1881
καὶ ἔχω προφητείαν – Westcott and Hort / [NA27 and UBS4 variants]
καὶ ἐὰν ἔχω προφητείαν – Tischendorf 8th Edition, Nestle 1904, Byz.

1 Corinthians 13:2

κἂν ἐὰν ἔχω πᾶσαν – Westcott and Hort / [NA27 and UBS4 variants]
κἂν ἔχω πᾶσαν – Westcott and Hort 1881
καὶ ἔχω πᾶσαν – Westcott and Hort / [NA27 and UBS4 variants]
καὶ ἐὰν ἔχω πᾶσαν – Tischendorf 8th Edition, Nestle 1904, Byz.

1 Corinthians 13:2

μεθιστάναι (to (re)move/(ex)change)– Alexandrian text-type, Tischendorf 8th Edition, Nestle 1904, Westcott and Hort / [NA27 and UBS4 variants]
μεθιστάνειν – Byz., Westcott and Hort 1881, Westcott and Hort / [NA27 and UBS4 variants]

1 Corinthians 13:3

καυχήσωμαι (I may boast) – Alexandrian text-type. By 2009, many translators and scholars had come to favour this variant as the original reading on the grounds that is probably the oldest.
καυθήσωμαι (I may be burnt/burned) – Mostly Western and Byzantine text-type MSS and "a majority of patristic writers". In 1989, this was the most commonly favoured variant by translators and scholars, but because it is probably not the oldest variant, and may be grammatically incorrect, a large amount of translators and scholars had abandoned it by 2009. Malone (2009) objected that it would be somewhat unlikely that a supposedly correct original (καυχήσωμαι) would have been deliberately 'corrected' by a scribe, resulting in a supposedly incorrect variant (καυθήσωμαι).
καυθήσομαι (I will be burnt/burned) – As of 2009, a minority of scholars favoured this reading as the original.
? –
? –
καθήσωμαι – 330*
καυθήσεται – 1877 2492 Syr^{p,h} Clem
καυθήσηται – John of Damascus

1 Textual variants in 1 Corinthians 14

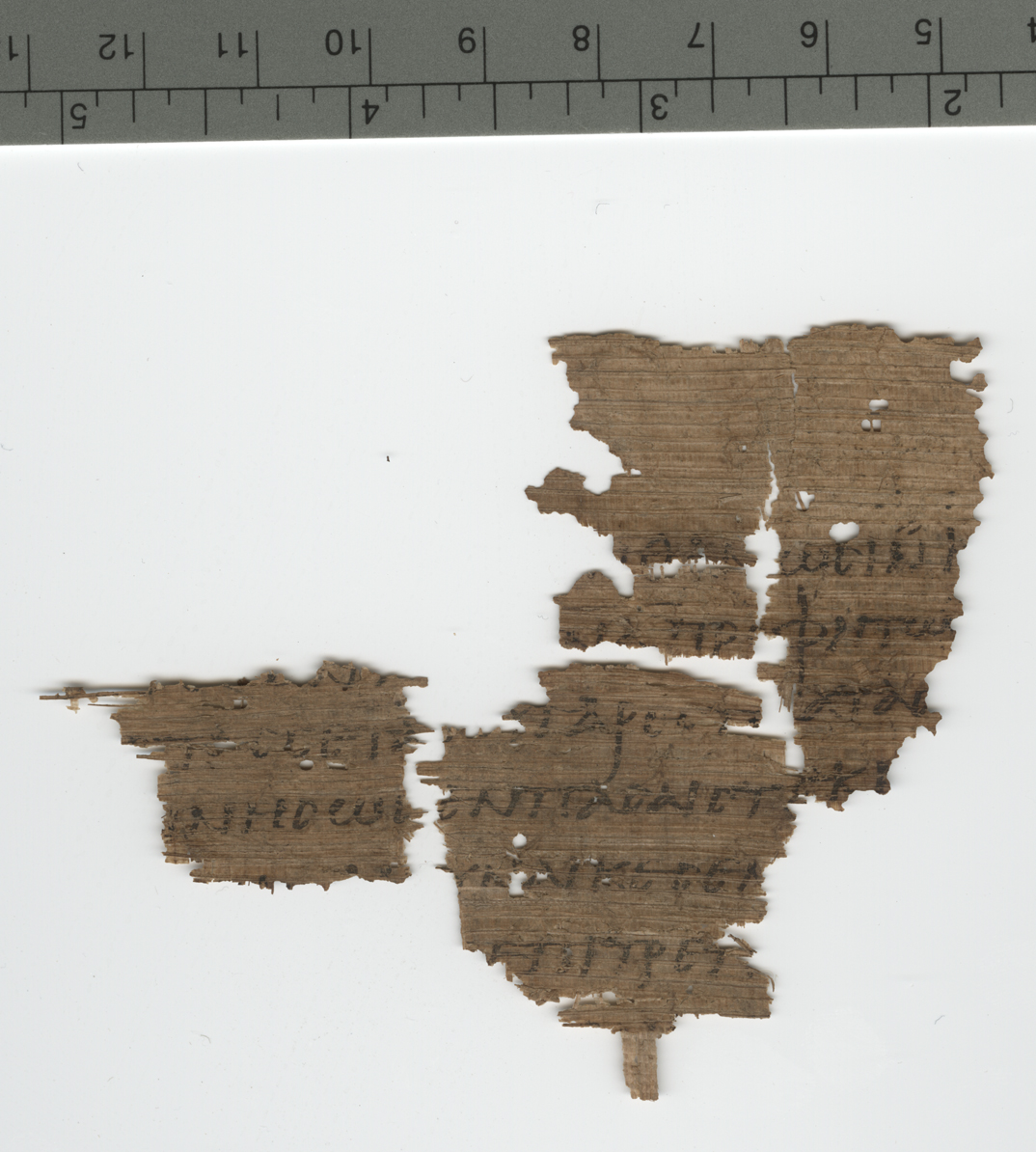
1 Corinthians 14:31-34 from 𝔓^{123}

1 Corinthians 14:40

verses 14:34-35 included after 14:40 – D F G 88

4 Textual variants in 1 Corinthians 15

1 Corinthians 15:3

ὃ καὶ παρέλαβον (I received) – omitted by b, Ambrosiaster, Irenaeus^{lat}, Tertullian?

1 Corinthians 15:15

εἴπερ ἄρα νεκροὶ οὐκ ἐγείρονται (if in fact the dead do not rise) – omitted by D, a, b, r, bam, ful**, harl*, kar, mon, reg, val*, pesh, Ambrosiaster, Irenaeus (lat), Tertullian?

1 Corinthians 15:47

δευτερος ανθρωπος – א*, B, C, D, F, G, 0243, 33, 1739, it, vg, cop^{bo} eth
δευτερος ο κυριος – 630
δευτερος ανθρωπος ο κυριος – א^{c}, A, D^{c}, K, P, Ψ, 81, 104, 181, 326, 330, 436, 451, 614, 629, 1241, 1739^{mg}, 1877, 1881, 1984, 1985, 2127, 2492, 2495, Byz, Lect
δευτερος ανθρωπος πνευματικος – 𝔓^{46}
δευτερος – cop^{sa} Cyril

1 Corinthians 15:51

μέν (on the one hand) – Byz
omitted by א, (A), C, G_{3}, 17

1 Textual variants in 1 Corinthians 16

1 Corinthians 16:15

οικιαν Στεφανα – 𝔓^{46} א* A B C^{2} Ψ 075 Byz cop
οικιαν Στεφανα και Φορτουνατου – א ^{2} D 104 629 1175 1241 2464 pc b vgst cop^{bo}
οικιαν Στεφανα και Φορτουνατου και Αχαικου – C*^{vid} F G 365 2495 pc vg^{cl} syr^{h}

== Second Epistle to the Corinthians ==
1 Textual variants in 2 Corinthians 1

2 Corinthians 1:10

τηλικουτου θανατου – א, A, B, C, D^{gr}, G^{gr}, K, P, Ψ, 0121a, 0209, 0243, 33, 81, 88, 104, 181, 326, 330, 436, 451, 614, 1241, 1739, 1877, 1881, 1962, 1984, 1985, 2127, 2492, 2495, Byz
τηλικουτου κινδυνου – 629
τηλικουτων θανατων – 𝔓^{46}, 630, 1739^{c}, it^{d,e}, syr^{p,h}, goth

1 Textual variants in 2 Corinthians 2

2 Corinthians 2:12

απλοτητι – D, G, 104, 181, 326, 330, 436, 451, 614, 1241, 1739, 1877, 1984, 1985, 2495, Byz
αγιοτητι – 𝔓^{46}, א, A, B, C, K, P, Ψ, 0121a, 0243, 33, 81, 630
πραοτητι – 88, 635
σπλαγχνοις – eth

0 Textual variants in 2 Corinthians 3

2 Corinthians 3:1

1 Textual variants in 2 Corinthians 4

2 Corinthians 4:14

τὸν κύριον Ἰησοῦν – א, B, 630, 1739, Marcion, Tertulian, Origen
τὸν Ἰησοῦν – 𝔓^{46}, Β
Ἰησοῦν – 0243, 33, 630, 1739, 1984, 1985
τὸν κύριον ἡμῶν Ἰησοῦν – syr^{p, h}
τὸν κύριον ἡμῶν Ἰησοῦν Χριστόν – it^{ar}
τὸν κύριον Ἰησοῦν Χριστόν – 436
τὸν κύριον Ἰησοῦν ἐκ νεκρῶν – 2492

0 Textual variants in 2 Corinthians 5

2 Corinthians 5:1

0 Textual variants in 2 Corinthians 6

2 Corinthians 6:1

0 Textual variants in 2 Corinthians 7

2 Corinthians 7:1

1 Textual variants in 2 Corinthians 8

2 Corinthians 8:19

σύν – 𝔓^{46}, א, D, G, K, Ψ, 181, 330, 436, 451, 614, 629, 1241, 1984, 1985, 2492, 2495, Byz, Lect
ἐν – Β, C, P, 0225, 0243, 33, 81, 88, 104, 326, 630, 1739, 1877, 1881, 1962, 2127, it^{dem, f, x, z} vg syr^{p}, cop^{sa, bo}, arm, eth, Ambrosiaster

0 Textual variants in 2 Corinthians 9

2 Corinthians 9:1

1 Textual variants in 2 Corinthians 10

2 Corinthians 10:12-13

οὐ συνιᾶσιν. ἡμεῖς δέ (are not wise. We, however) – omitted by D*, F, G, a, b, d, f, (429?) Ambrosiaster

1 Textual variants in 2 Corinthians 11

2 Corinthians 11:17

κυριον – majority
ανθρωπον – 69
θεον – a f r t vg^{cl}

0 Textual variants in 2 Corinthians 12

2 Corinthians 12:1

0 Textual variants in 2 Corinthians 13

2 Corinthians 13:1

== Epistle to the Galatians ==
0 Textual variants in Galatians 1

Galatians 1:1

3 Textual variants in Galatians 2

Galatians 2:12

ἦλθεν ([he] came) – א, B, D_{2}G_{3} cu^{2} Origen
ἦλθον ([they] came) – others

Galatians 2:20

υιου του θεου – א, A, C, D^{2}, Ψ
θεου και Χριστου – B, D*, F, G, (b)

Galatians 2:20

αγαπησαντος – all mss.
αγορασαντος – Marcion

1 Textual variants in Galatians 3

Galatians 3:14

ἐπαγγελίαν – א, A, B, C, D^{2}, K, P, Ψ, 33, 81, 88^{mg}, 104, 181, 330, 436, 451, 614, 629, 630, 1241, 1739, 1877, 1881, 1962, 1984, 2127, 2492, 2465, Byz, Lect, it, vg. syr, cop, arm
εὐλογίαν – 𝔓^{46}, D*, F^{gr}, G, 88*, it

0 Textual variants in Galatians 4

Galatians 4:1

1 Textual variants in Galatians 5

Galatians 5:21

φθόνοι – 𝔓^{46}, א, B, 33, 81, 2492, ℓ 603, ℓ 809, it, cop^{sa}
φθόνοι φόνοι – A, C, D, G, K, P, Ψ, 0122, 88, 104, 181, 326, 330, 436, 451, 630, 1241, 1739, 1877, 1881, 1962, 1985, 2127, 2495, Byz, Lect

2 Textual variants in Galatians 6

Galatians 6:2

αναπληρωσετε – B G 1962 it vg syr^{p,pal} cop^{sa,bo} goth eth
αποπληρωσετε – 𝔓^{46}
αναπληρωσατε – א, A, C, D^{gr}, K, P, Ψ, 0122, 33, 81, 88, 104, 181, Byz

Galatians 6:15

οὔτε γὰρ (for neither) – 'two good cursives'
ἐν γὰρ Χριστῷ Ἰησοῦ οὔτε (for in Christ Jesus neither) א, A, C, D_{2}, G_{3}, P_{2}

== Epistle to the Ephesians ==
Christological Variant

Ephesians 3:9 textus receptus KJV

And to make all men see what is the fellowship of the mystery, which from the beginning of the world hath been hid in God, who created all things by Jesus Christ

Ephesians 3:9 critical manuscripts NIV

And to make plain to everyone the administration of this mystery, which for ages past was kept hidden in God, who created all things

2 Textual variants in Ephesians 1

Ephesians 1:1

ἐν Ἐφέσῳ – א^{c}, A, B^{3}, D*, G, K, P, Ψ, 33, 81, 88, 104, 181, 326, 330, 436, 451, 614, 629, 630, 1241, 1877, 1881, 1962, 1984, 1985, 2127, 2492, 2495, Byz, Lect, it, vg, syr, cop, goth, arm
omitted by – 𝔓^{46}, א*, B*, 424^{c}, 1739

Ephesians 1:7

χαριτος – majority
χρηστοτητος – Α 365 cop^{bo}

3 Textual variants in Ephesians 2

Ephesians 2:1

αμαρτιαις – majority
επιθυμιαις – Β

Ephesians 2:15

καινον – majority
κοινον – 𝔓^{46} F G
και μονον – K

Ephesians 2:20

Χριστου – 𝔓^{46} Β G 88 436 1739 1881
του Χριστου – D K 181 326 614 629 630 1877 1984 2495
Κυριυ – א A P Ψ 33 81 104 330 451 1241 1962 2127 2492 sur^{h} cop^{bo} arm eth
του Θεου – 1985
omit – C

0 Textual variants in Ephesians 3

Ephesians 3:1

2 Textual variants in Ephesians 4

Ephesians 4:14

του διαβολου – Alexandrinus
της πλανης – rest of mss.

Ephesians 4:28

ταις χερσιν το αγαθον – 𝔓^{46}, א^{b}, B, a, vgst
το αγαθον – Porphyrianus, 6, 33, 1739, 1881
το αγαθον ταις χερσιν – L, Ψ, 323, 326, 614, 630, 945
το αγαθον ταις ιδιαις χερσιν – K, 2495
εν ταις χερσιν αυτου το αγαθον – 629
ταις ιδιαις χερσιν το αγαθον – Sinaiticus, A, D, F, G, 81, 104, 365, 1175, 1241, 2464, vg^{cl}

1 Textual variants in Ephesians 5

Ephesians 5:9

φωτός – 𝔓^{49}, א, A, B, D*, G, P, 33, 81, 330, 629, 1739*, 1877, 1881, 1962, 2127, 2492, Lect, it, cop
πνεύματος – 𝔓^{46}, D^{c}, K, Ψ, 88, 104, 181, 326, 436, 451, 614, 630, 1241, 1739^{mg}, 1877, 1984, 1985, 2495, Byz, ℓ 809, syr^{h}

1 Textual variants in Ephesians 6

Ephesians 6:12

μεθοδιας – 𝔓^{46}
αρχας προς τας εξουσιας – rell

== Epistle to the Philippians ==
1 Textual variants in Philippians 1

Philippians 1:14

του θεου – א A B (D*) P Ψ 33 81 104 326 365 629 1175 1241 2464
κυρίου – F, G, Cyp
omitted – 𝔓^{46} D^{2} Byz r, Marcion

1 Textual variants in Philippians 2

Philippians 2:30

Χριστοῦ – 𝔓^{46}, B, G, 88, 436, 1739, 1881, Origen
τοῦ Χριστοῦ – D, K, 181, 326, 614, 629, 630, 1877, 1984 1495, Byz, Lect
κυρίου – א^{c}, A, P, Ψ, 33, 81, 104, 330, 451, 1241, 1962, 2127, 2492, syr, cop, arm, eth
τοῦ θεοῦ – 1985, Chrysostom
omit – C

1 Textual variants in Philippians 3

Philippians 3:16

τω αυτω στοιχειν – 𝔓^{16}, 𝔓^{46}, א, A, B, I, 33, 424, 1739, cop^{sa, bo}, eth^{ro}
το αυτο φρονειν – 1881
το αυτο φρονειν, τω αυτω στοιχειν – (D* τω αυτοι) (G συνστοιχειν) it^{ar, d, e, g}
το αυτο φρονειν, τω αυτω κανονι στοιχειν – (D^{c} 436 στοιχειν κανονι) 81, 104, 330, 451, 1241, 2127, 2492
τω αυτω στοιχειν κανονι, το αυτο φρονειν – K, P, Ψ, 88, 181, 326, 424, 614, 630, 1877, 1962, 1984, 1985, 2495, Byz
τω αυτω κανονι στοιχειν, το αυτο φρονειν – 69, 1908

1 Textual variants in Philippians 4

Philippians 4:7

σωματα – F G a d
νοηματα και τα σωματα – 𝔓^{16}
νοηματα – rell

== Epistle to the Colossians ==
3 Textual variants in Colossians 1

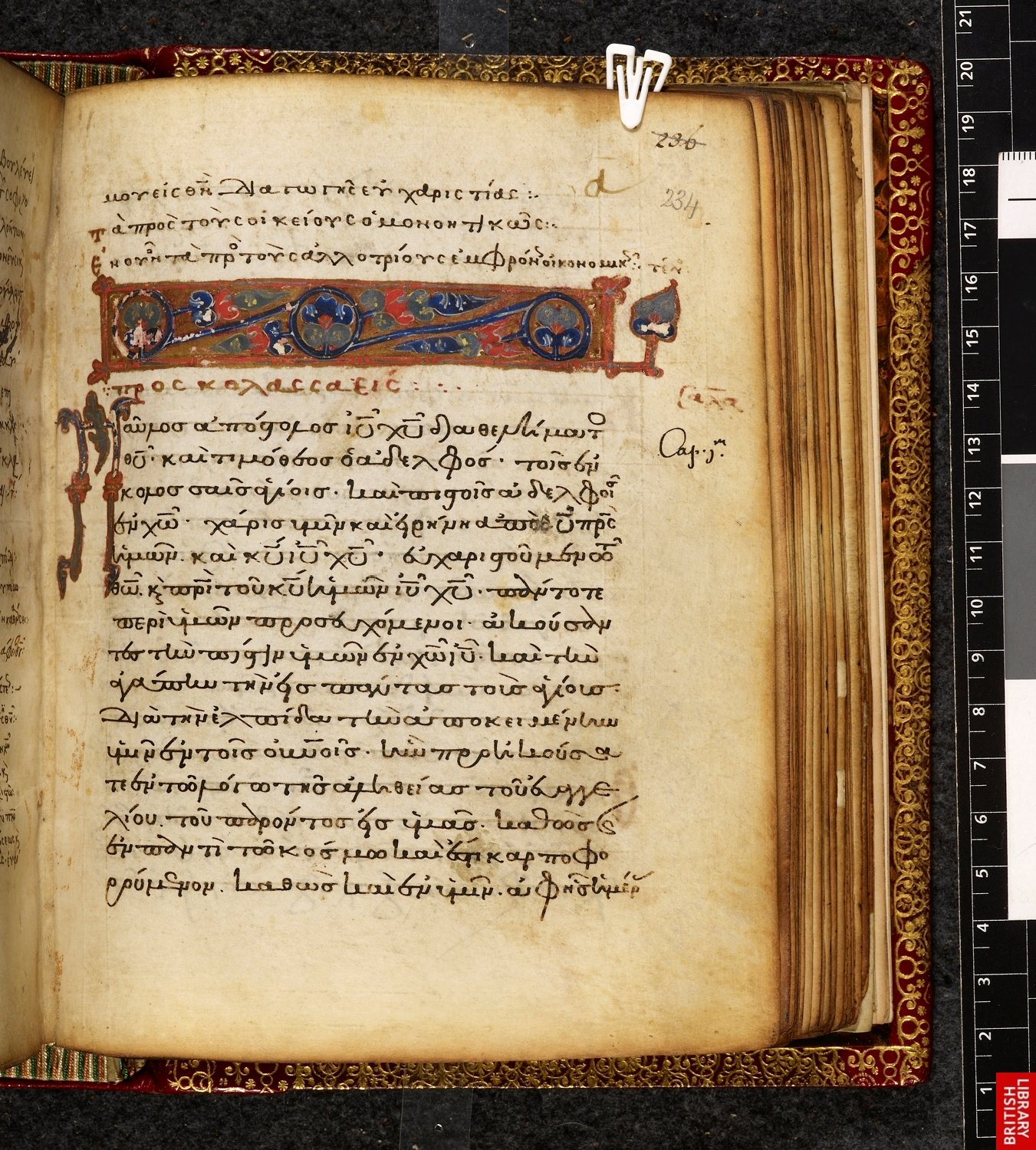
Minuscule 321, first page of Colossians

Colossians 1:12

ικανωσαντι ημας - ς
ικανωσαντι υμας - WH

Colossians 1:14 (see Ephesians 1:7)

απολυτρωσιν δια του αιματος αυτου (redemption through the blood of him) – 383 424 614 630 1505 1912 2200 2344* 2464 Byz^{pt} (i.e., 76 206 221 223 330 876 1518 1611 1960 2005 2412) ℓ^{mss} vg^{cl} syr^{h} arm slav Gregory Cassiodorus
απολυτρωσιν (redemption) – rell (all other extant MSS and Church Fathers)

Colossians 1:28

Χριστω – 𝔓^{46} א* A B C D* F G 33 81 1241 1739 1881 2464
Χριστω Ιησου – א^{2} D^{2} H Ψ Byz

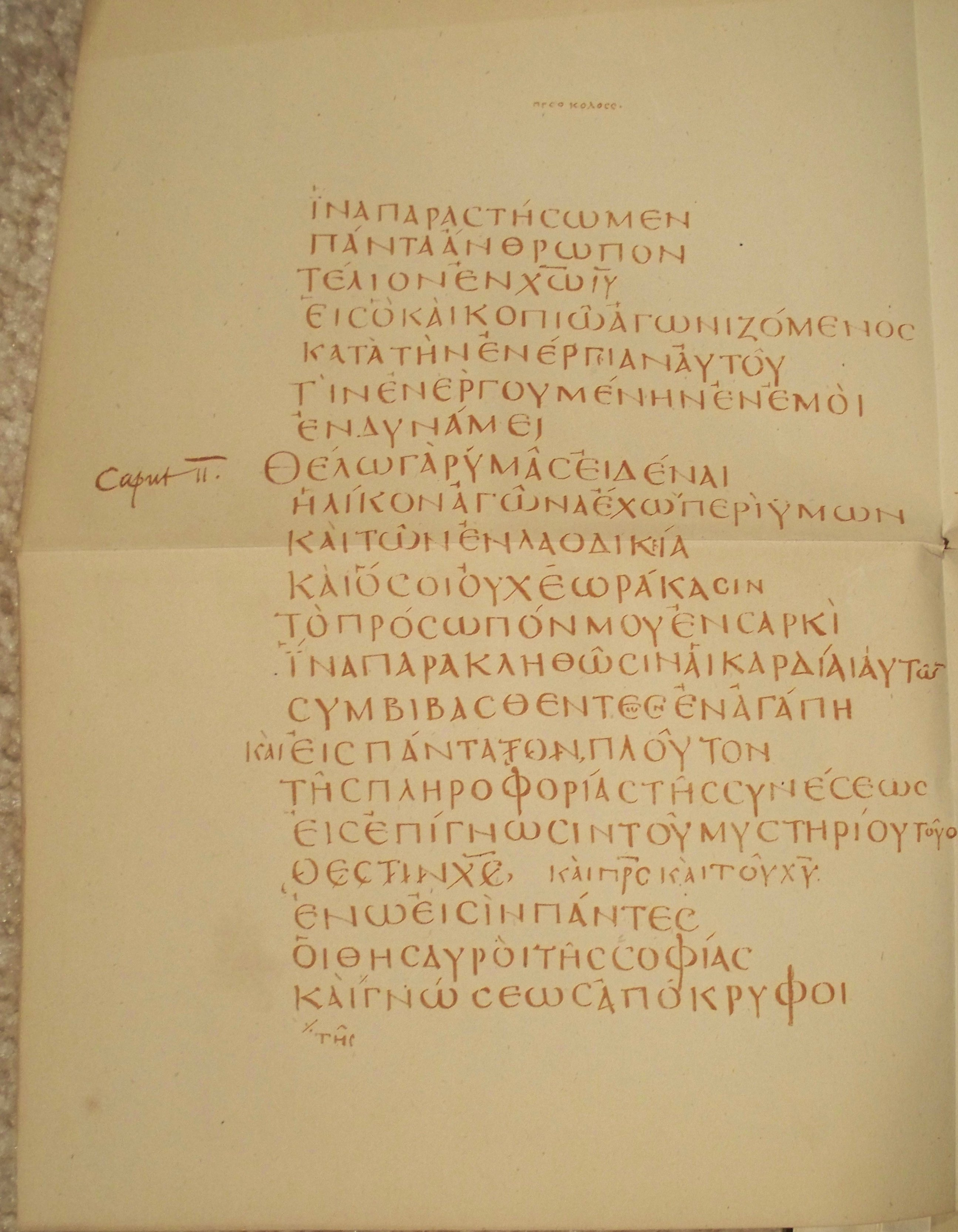
Codex Claromontanus, Colossians 1:28b-2:3

1 Textual variants in Colossians 2

Colossians 2:1

1 Textual variants in Colossians 3

Colossians 3:13

κύριος – 𝔓^{46}, A B D* G ℓ 809 it vg Pelagius Augustine
Χριστός – א^{c} C D^{c} K P Ψ 81 88 104 181 326 330 436 451 614 629 630 1241 1739 1877 1881 1962 1984 1985 2127 2492 2495 Byz Lect it syr cop goth eth
θεός – א*
θεός ἐν Χριστῷ – 33 arm Augustine

1 Textual variants in Colossians 4

Colossians 4:8

γνωτε τα περι ημων – A B D* F G P 048 33 81 365 1175
γνωτε τα περι υμων – א*
γνω τα περι υμων – 𝔓^{46} א^{2} C D^{1} Ψ Byz
γνω τα περι ημων – 451 ℓ 598 and ℓ 1356

== First Epistle to the Thessalonians ==
0 Textual variants in 1 Thessalonians 1

1 Thessalonians 1:1

1 Textual variants in 1 Thessalonians 2

1 Thessalonians 2:7

νήπιοι (babies) – 𝔓^{65}, א*, B, C*, G, I, Ψ*, 104*, 326^{c}, 451, 1962, 2495, it, vg, cop, eth
ἤπιοι (gentle) – א^{c}, A, C^{2}, D^{c}, K, P, Ψ^{c}, 33, 81, 88, 104^{c}, 181, 326*, 330, 436, 614, 629, 630, 1241, 1739, 1877, 1881, 1984, 1985, 2127, 2992, Byz, Lect

2 Textual variants in 1 Thessalonians 3

1 Thessalonians 3:2

και συνεργον του θεου εν τω ευαγγελιω του Χριστου (Gods co-worker in the Gospel of Christ) – D Byz f m vg syr cop
και συνεργον εν τω ευαγγελιω του Χριστου (co-worker in the Gospel of Christ) – B 1962
και διακονον του θεου εν τω ευαγγελιω του Χριστου (Gods servant in the Gospel of Christ) – א A Π Ψ 81 629 1241 1739 1881
διακονον και συνεργον του θεου εν τω ευαγγελιω του Χριστου – G it^{f,g}
και διακονον του θεου συνεργον ημων εν τω ευαγγελιω του Χριστου (Gods servant and our fellow laborer in the Gospel of Christ) – D^{c} K 88 104 181 326 330 436 451 614 629 630 1877 1984 1985 2127 2492 2495 Byz Lect

1 Thessalonians 3:9

θεω (to God) – א^{b} A B D^{2} Ψ Byz f m vg syr cop
κυριω (to the Lord) – א* D* F G a b vg bo

0 Textual variants in 1 Thessalonians 4

1 Thessalonians 4:1

0 Textual variants in 1 Thessalonians 5

1 Thessalonians 5:1

== Second Epistle to the Thessalonians ==
1 Textual variants in 2 Thessalonians 1

2 Thessalonians 1:12

Ιησου (Jesus) – א B D K L Ψ 0111 6 323 630 1175 1241 2464 Byz^{pt} it^{b} cop^{sa,bo^{pt}}
Ιησου Χριστου (Jesus Christ) – A F G P 0278 33 81 104 365 1505 1739 1881 Byz^{pt} lat syr cop^{bo^{pt}}

5 Textual variants in 2 Thessalonians 2

2 Thessalonians 2:2

Χριστου (Christ) – D^{2} Byz
κυριου (Lord) – rell

2 Thessalonians 2:3

ανομιας (lawlessness) – א B 0278 6 81 88^{mg} 104 326 365 436 1739 1881 2127 2464 ℓ^{1365} it^{m} co
αμαρτιας (sinfulness) – A D G K L P Ψ 88* 181 330 451 614 629 630 1241 1877 1962 1984 1985 2492 2495 Byz Lect lat syr Irenaeus^{lat} Eusebius

2 Thessalonians 2:8

ο κυριος (the LORD) – B D^{2} 1739 1881 Byz Irenaeus
ο κυριος Ιησους (the Lord Jesus) – א A D* F G P Ψ 0278 33 81 104 365 1241 2464 latt syr cop Irenaeus^{lat} Origen Didymus

2 Thessalonians 2:13

θεου (God) – D* lat
κυριου (Lord) – rell

2 Thessalonians 2:13

απαρχην (first-fruits) – B F G P 0278 33 81 323 326 365 1505 1739 1881 2464 vg syr^{h} cop^{bo}
απ' αρχης (from the beginning) – א D Ψ Byz it syr^{p} cop^{sa}

2 Textual variants in 2 Thessalonians 3

2 Thessalonians 3:3

ο κυριος (the LORD) – א B D^{2} Ψ 0278 33 1739 1881 Byz vg^{mss} syr cop
ο θεος (God) – A D* F G 2464 it vg^{cl}

2 Thessalonians 3:16

τροπω – א A^{c} B D K P Ψ 81 88 104
τοπω – A* D* F G 33 76

== First Epistle to Timothy ==
1 Textual variants in 1 Timothy 1

1 Timothy 1:16

Ιησους (Jesus) – F G 1739 1881
Χριστος Ιησους (Christ Jesus) – A D* H Ψ 0262^{vid} 33 104 326 365 629 1175 lat
Ιησους Χριστος (Jesus Christ) – א D^{2} Byz it^{ar} vg^{mss} syr
Ιησους ο Χριστος (Jesus the Christ) – 614

1 Textual variants in 1 Timothy 2

1 Timothy 2:7

αληθειαν λεγω (I am telling the truth) – א^{2} A D* F G P Ψ 075 0150 6 81 104 263 330 424^{c} 451 459 629 1175 1505 1739 1881 1912 2492 Lect^{mss} lat syr cop eth Ambrosiaster Ambrose Chrysostom John^{Dam}
αληθειαν λεγω εγω (I am telling the truth) – 2495
αληθειαν λεγω Χριστος (I am telling the truth of Christ) – 436
αληθειαν λεγω εν Χριστω (I am telling the truth in Christ) – א* D^{2} H K L 33^{vid} 88 181 256 326 365 424* 614 630 1241 1573 1852 1877 2127 Byz Lect^{mss} it^{ar} vg^{mss} goth arm slav Theodoret Euthalius
αληθειαν λεγω εν Χριστω Ιησου (I am telling the truth in Christ Jesus) – 1319

3 Textual variants in 1 Timothy 3

1 Timothy 3:1

ανθρωπινος (human or of a man) – D* it^{b,d,g,m,mon} Ambrosiaster Jerome^{mss} Augustine Speculum
πιστος (faithful) – rell

1 Timothy 3:14

προς σε (to you) – omitted by F G 6 1739 1881 cop^{sa}

1 Timothy 3:16

ομολογουμεν ως (just as we are professing) – D* 1175
ομολογουμενως (admittedly) – rell

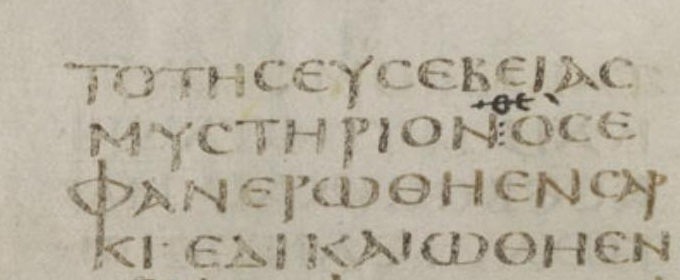
1 Timothy 3:16 in Codex Sinaiticus (א) from 330-360 AD

1 Timothy 3:16

ος εφανερωθη (he who was manifested) – א* A* C* F G 33 365 442 1175 2127 ℓ^{60} ℓ^{599} syr goth eth Origen^{lat} Didymus Epiphanius Jerome Cyril Liberatus
ο εφανερωθη (which was manifested) – D* it vg
ω εφανερωθη (which was made manifest) – 061
Θ̅Ϲ̅ εφανερωθη or θεος εφανερωθη (God was manifested) – א^{c} A^{c} C^{c} D^{c} K L P Ψ 075 0150 6 81 104 181 263 326 330 424 436 451 459 614 629 630 1241 1319 1573 1739 1852 1877 1881 1912 1962 1984 1985 2200 2492 2495 Byz Lect^{mss} slav Gregory Chrysostom Theodoret Euthalius Theodore of Mopsuestia
ο θεος εφανερωθη (the God was manifested) – 88
ος θεος εφανερωθη (the God who was manifested) – 256 ℓ^{597}

1 Textual variants in 1 Timothy 4

1 Timothy 4:10

αγωνιζομεθα – א* A C F^{gr} G^{gr} K Ψ 33 88 104 326 442 915 1175
ονειδιζομεθα – א^{c} D L (P ονειδιζωμεθα) 81 181 330 436 451 614 629 630 1241 1739 1877 Byz Lect
ωνειδιζομεθα – 1881 1985

3 Textual variants in 1 Timothy 5

1 Timothy 5:5

θεον (God) – C F G P Ψ 048 lat syr cop
τον θεον (of God) – א^{2} A D^{2} 1739 1881 Byz
τον κυριον (of the LORD) – D* 81 vg^{mss}
κυριον (the LORD) – א*

1 Timothy 5:19

εκτος ει μη επι δυο η τριων μαρτυρων (except from two or three witnesses) – omitted by it^{b} Ambrosiaster Jerome^{mss} Pelagius

1 Timothy 5:21

Χριστου Ιησου – א A D* G 33 81 104 365 629 latt cop Clement
Ιησου Χριστου – F Ψ 630 1175 1739 1881
κυριου Ιησου Χριστου – D^{2} Byz syr

2 Textual variants in 1 Timothy 6

1 Timothy 6:7

οτι – א A F G 048 061 33 81 1739 1881
δηλον οτι – א^{c} D^{c} K L P Ψ 104 181 326 330 436 451 614 629 630 1241 1877 1962 1984 1985 2127 2492 2495 Byz
αλητες οτι – D*

1 Timothy 6:21

αμην (Amen) – א^{2} D^{2} K L P Ψ 075 0150 6 88 104 181 256 263 326 330 365 424 436 451 459 614 629 630 1175 1241 1319 1573 1739^{c} 1852 1877 1912 1962 1984 1985 2127 2200 2492 2495 Byz Lect it^{mss} vg^{mss} syr cop^{bo} eth slav Ambrosiaster Theodoret John^{Dam}
omitted – א* A D* F G 33 81 1311 1739* 1881 it^{mss} vg^{mss} cop^{sa} Chrysostom Pelagius Euthalius^{mss} Speculum

== Second Epistle to Timothy ==
1 Textual variants in 2 Timothy 1

2 Timothy 1:11

καὶ διδάσκαλος (and teacher) – א*, A, I, 1175, syr^{pal}
καὶ διάκονος (and servant) – 33
καὶ διδάσκαλος ἐθνῶν (and teacher of nations) – א^{c}, D, G, K, Ψ, 81, 88, 104, 181, 326, 330, 436, 451, 614, 629, 630, 1241, 1739, 1877, 1881, 1962, 1985, 2127, 2492, 2495, Byz, Lect

1 Textual variants in 2 Timothy 2

2 Timothy 2:14

θεοῦ (of God) – א, C, G, I, 330, 436, 451, 614, 629, 630, 1877, 1962, 2492, 2495, ℓ 598, it
κυρίου (of the Lord) – A, D, K, P, Ψ, 048, 81, 88, 104, 181, 326, 1241, 1739, 1881, 1984, 1985, 2127, Byz, Lect
Χριστου (of Christ) – 206, 429, 1758

1 Textual variants in 2 Timothy 3

2 Timothy 3:1

2 Textual variants in 2 Timothy 4

2 Timothy 4:10

Γαλατιαν (to Galatia) – A D F G K L P Ψ 33 88 181 330 451 614 629 630 1241 1739 1877 1881 1962 1984 1985 2127 2492 2495 Byz Lect
Γαλλιαν (to Gaul) – א C 81 104 326 436
Γαλιλαιαν (to Galilee) – cop^{bo}

2 Timothy 4:22

Ιησους (Jesus) – A, 104, 614, vgst
Ιησους Χριστος (Jesus Christ) – א^{2}, C, D, Ψ, Byz, a, b, f, vg^{cl}
κυριος (Lord) – א, F, G, 33, 1739, 1881, cop^{sa}

== Epistle to Titus ==
1 Textual variants in Titus 1

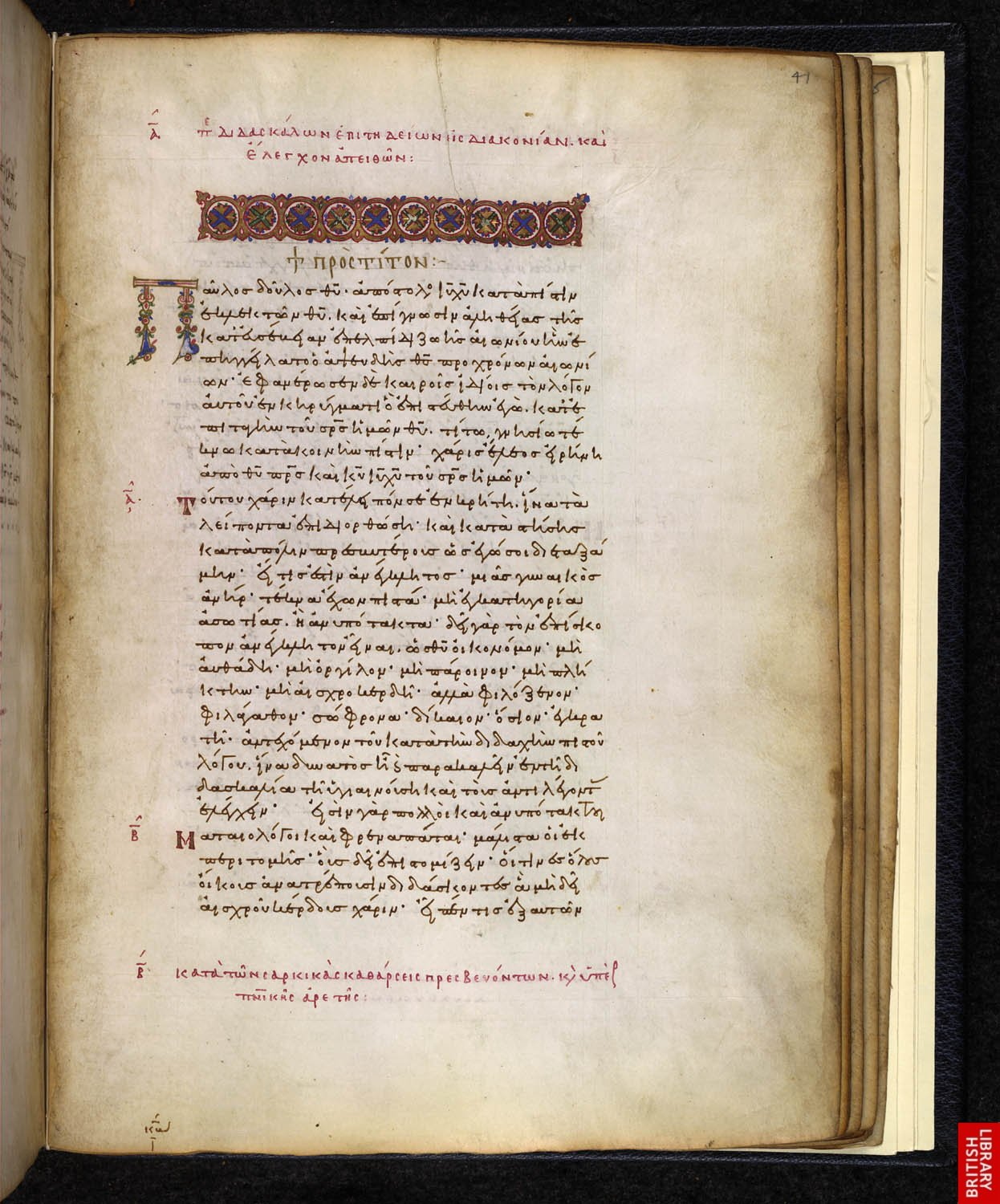
The first page of the Epistle to Titus in Minuscule 699

Titus 1:14

ἐνταλμασιν – F, G
γενεαλογιας – 1908
ἐντολαῖς – rell

1 Textual variants in Titus 2

Titus 2:7

αφθοριαν – א Α C D* Κ P 33 (81) 104 1739 2495 al g vgst
αδιαφθοριαν – א^{2} D^{2} Ψ Byz
αφθονιαν – 𝔓^{32} F G 1881 pc

1 Textual variants in Titus 3

Titus 3:9

λογομαχιας – F, G
γενεαλογίας – rell

== Epistle to Philemon ==
3 Textual variants in Philemon

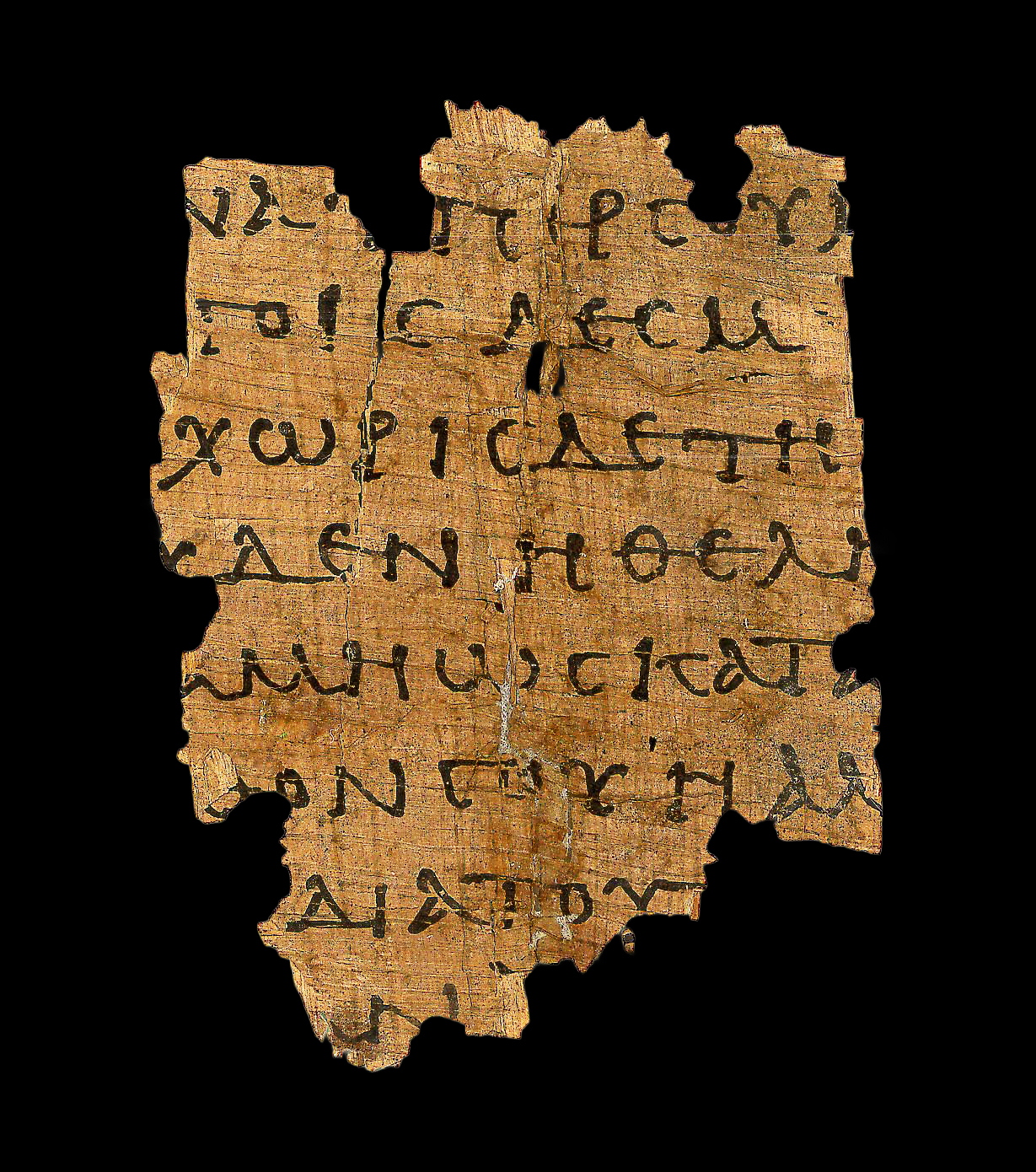
𝔓^{87} (Gregory-Aland), fragment of Epistle to Philemon

Philemon 1

Παῦλος δέσμιος Χριστοῦ Ἰησοῦ – majority of mss
Παῦλος ἀπόστολος Χριστοῦ Ἰησοῦ – D*
Παῦλος ἀπόστολος δέσμιος Χριστοῦ Ἰησοῦ – 629
Παῦλος δοῦλος Χριστοῦ Ἰησοῦ – 323, 945

Philemon 5

προς τον κυριον Ιησουν – Sinaiticus D^{2} F G Ψ Byz
εις τον κυριον Ιησουν – A C 048 33
εις τον κυριον Ιησουν Χριστον – D*
εν Χριστω Ιησου – 629

Philemon 6

αγαθου – majority of mss
εργου – F G vg^{Cl}

== Epistle to the Hebrews ==
1 Textual variants in Hebrews 1

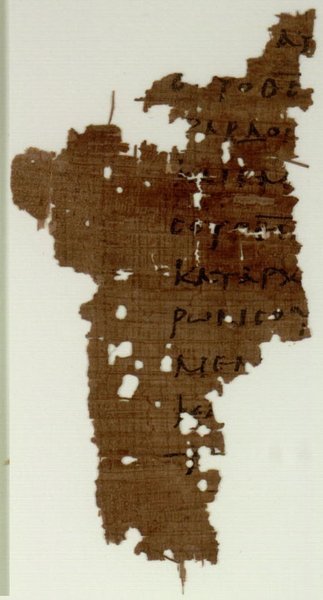
Hebrews 1:7-12 from 𝔓^{114}

Hebrews 1:3

φερων τε τα παντα τω ρηματι της δυναμεως αυτου upholding the universe by his word of power – rest of the manuscripts
φανερων τε τα παντα τω ρηματι της δυναμεως αυτου revealed the universe by his word of power – Codex Vaticanus

1 Textual variants in Hebrews 2

Hebrews 2:9

χάριτι θεοῦ (by the grace of God) – 𝔓^{46}, א, A, B, C, D, K, P, Ψ, 33, 81, 88, 104, 181, 326, 330, 424, 436, 451, 614, 629, 630, 1241, 1877, 1881, 1962, 1984, 1985, 2127, 2492, 2495, Byz, Lect, it, cop, arm, eth, Origen, Eusebius, Athanasius, Cyril of Alexandria.
χωρὶς θεοῦ (apart from God) – 0121b, 424^{c}, 1739, mss, Peshitta, Origen, Theodore of Mopsuestia, St. Ambrose of Milan, St. Jerome, Fulgentius, Theodoret.

1 Textual variants in Hebrews 3

Hebrews 3:6

κατασχωμεν – 𝔓^{13}, 𝔓^{46}, B, cop^{sa}
μεχρι τελους βεβαιαν κατασχωμεν – א, A, B, C, D, Ψ, 0121b, (323), Byz

0 Textual variants in Hebrews 4

Hebrews 4:1

0 Textual variants in Hebrews 5

Hebrews 5:1

0 Textual variants in Hebrews 6

Hebrews 6:1

1 Textual variants in Hebrews 7

Hebrews 7:9

χαριτι θεου – 𝔓^{46}, א, A, B, C, D, K, P, Ψ, 33, 81, 88, 104, 181, 326, 330, 424, 436, 451, 614, 629, 630, 1241, Byz, Lect
χωρις θεου – 0121b, 424^{c}, 1739

2 Textual variants in Hebrews 8

Hebrews 8:2

ουρανοις – rest of mss
ουρανιοις – 365 pc
υψηλοις – 33 vg^{mss}

Hebrews 8:11

πολιτην – 𝔓^{46}, א, A, B, D, K, 33, 88, 181, 330, 451, 614, 1241, 1739, 1877, 1881, 1962, 1984, 1985, 2127, 2492, 2495, Byz, Lect
πλησιον – P 81 104 436 629 630 1985
πλησιον αυτου και εκαστος τον πολιτην – 326

0 Textual variants in Hebrews 9

Hebrews 9:1

1 Textual variants in Hebrews 10

Hebrews 10:11

ιερευς – 𝔓^{46}, א, D, K, Ψ, 33, 81, 326, 330, 629, 1241, 1739, 1881, 1984, 2495, Byz, Lect
αρχιερευς – A, C, P, 88, 104, 181, 436, 451, 614, 630, 1877, 1962, 2127, 2492, syr, cop, arm, eth

0 Textual variants in Hebrews 11

Hebrews 11:1

0 Textual variants in Hebrews 12

Hebrews 12:1

1 Textual variants in Hebrews 13

Hebrews 13:21

παντι αγαθω – א, D, Ψ, it
εργω αγαθω – arm
παντι εργω αγαθω – C D^{c} K P 0121b 33 81 88 104 181 326 330 436 451 614 629 630 1241 1739 1877 1881 Byz
παντι εργω και λογω αγαθω – A

== Epistle of James ==
16 Textual variants in James 1

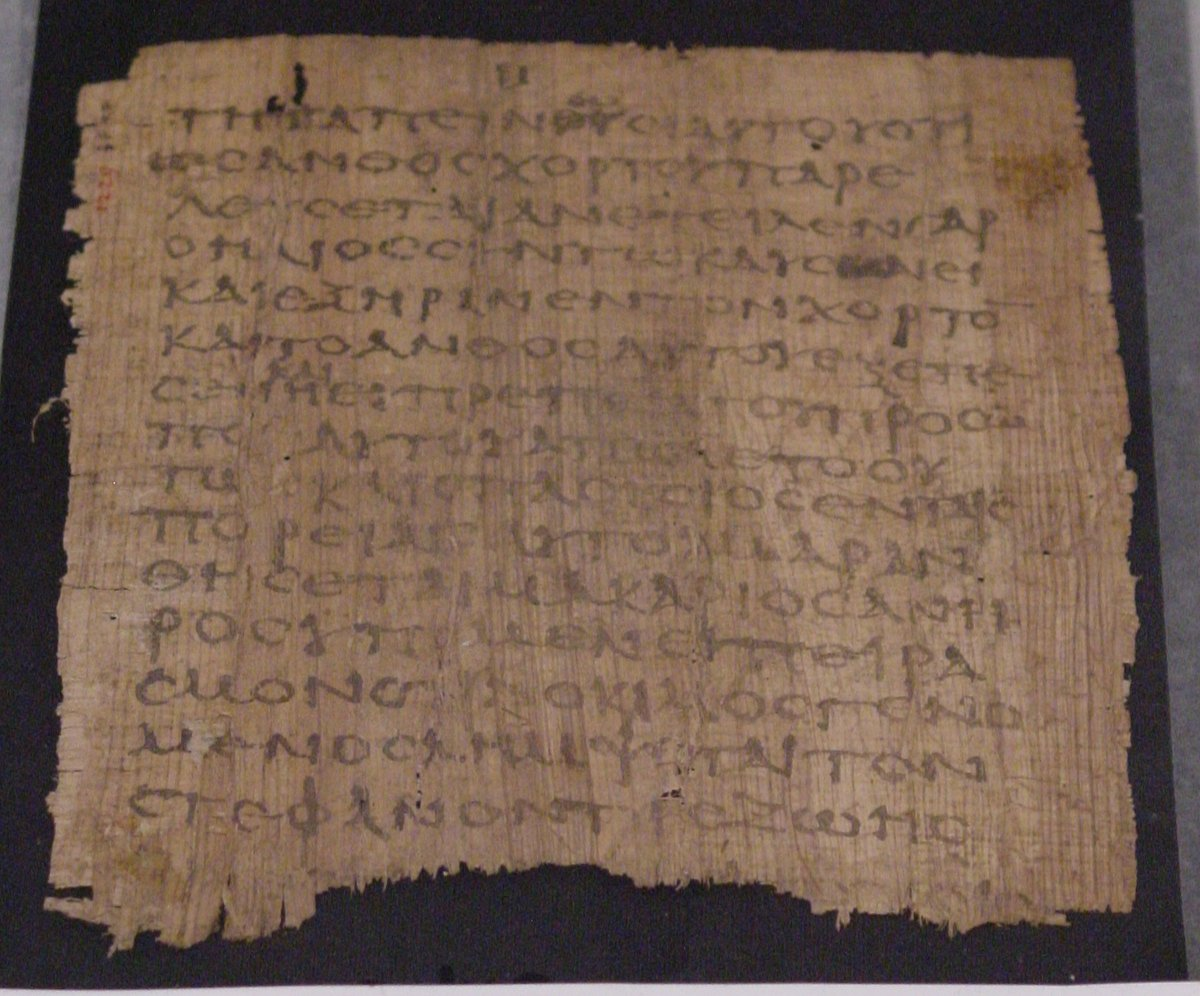
𝔓^{23} with text of James 1:10-12

Insciptio

Ιακωβου καθολικη επιστολη (Catholic Epistle of Jacob) — B^{c}
omit — א A B*

James 1:3

δοκιμον — 110 431 1241 Didymus^{pt}
δοκιμιον — 𝔓^{74}^{vid} א A B C K L P Ψ 049 056 0142 33 81 88 104 181 322 323 326 330 436 451 614 629 630 945 1067 1175 1243 1292 1409 1505 1611 1735 1739 1852 1877 2127 2138 2298 2344 2412 2464 2495 𝔐 Lect lat syr arm eth geo slav Didymus^{pt} Cyril

James 1:5

ουκ — 𝔐
μη — א A B C

James 1:9

ο αδελφος ο ταπεινος — 𝔐
αδελφος ο ταπεινος — B Ψ
ο ταπεινος αδελφος — 720
omit — 𝔓^{74}

James 1:12

ο κυριος (the Lord) — P 0246 𝔐
κυριος (Lord) — C
ο θεος (God) — 33^{vid} 323 945 1739 2816 vg syr^{p}
omitted — א A B Ψ 81 it^{ff} cop

James 1:12

επηγγειλατο — 𝔓^{23} א A B Ψ 81 206* 2344 it^{ff} cop arm geo Didymus^{pt}
επηγγειλατο ο θεος — 33^{vid} 322 323 463 547 945 1175 1241 1243 1735 1739 1852 2298 2464 2492 l596 lat syr^{p,pal} eth Athanasius Didymus^{pt} Chromatius Cyril John-Damascus
επηγγειλατο κυριος — C 794 1829 𝑙^{593} 𝑙^{680}
επηγγειλατο ο κυριος — K L P 049 056 0142 0246 88 104 181 326 330 436 451 614 629 630 1067 1292 1409 1505 1611 1877 2127 2138 2412 2495 𝔐 Lect syr^{h} (slav) Ps-Oecumenius Theophylact

James 1:13

απο — A B C 𝔐
υπο — א

James 1:17

παραλλαγη η τροπης αποσκιασμα — א^{2} A C K L P 049 056 0142 81 88 104 181 322 323 326 330 436 451 629 630 945 1067 1175 1243 1292 1409 1611 1735 1739 1852 1877 2127 2298 2344 2464 2492 𝔐 Lect lat syr arm Athanasius Cyril-Jerusalem Didymus Jerome John-Damascus
παραλλαγη ουδε η τροπης αποσκιασμα — Ψ
παραλλαγη η ορ η τροπης αποσκιασματος — א* B
παραλλαγη η τροπη αποσκιασματος — 614 1505 2412 2495 (slav)
παραλλαγης η τροπης αποσκιασματος — 𝔓^{23}
αποσκιασμα η τροπη η παραλλαγη — cop^{sa}
παραλλαγη η τροπη η τροπης αποσκιασμα ουδε μεχρι υπονοιας τινος υποβολη αποσκιασματος — 876 1518 1610 1765 2138
παραλλαγη η ροπης αποσκιασμα — Augustine Ferrandus Primasius
παραλλαγη η ροπη αποσκιασματος — it^{ff}

James 1:19

ιστε αδελφοι μου αγαπητοι ιστω δε — א*
ιστε αδελφοι μου αγαπητοι εστω — 436 1067 1175 1243 syr^{h^{mg}} arm
ιστε αδελφοι μου αγαπητοι εστω δε — א^{2} B C (81) 88 945 1739 2344 lat cop^{bo^{mss},(ach)} geo
ιστε δε αδελφοι μου αγαπητοι και εστως δε — A*
ιστε δε αδελφοι μου αγαπητοι και εστω δε — A^{c}
ιστε γαρ αδελφοι μου αγαπητοι εστω δε — it^{c}
ιστε δε αδελφοι μου αγαπητοι εστω δε — 𝔓^{74}^{vid} 2464 vg^{mss} cop^{sa,bo^{mss}}
ωστε αδελφοι μου αγαπητοι εστω δε — P* 1852
ωστε αδελφοι μου αγαπητοι εστω — K L P^{c} Ψ 049 056 0142 0246^{vid} 104 181 322 323 326 330 451 614 630 1241 1292 1409 1505 1611 1735 1877 2127 2138 2298 2412 2492 2495 𝔐 syr^{(p),h} slav Ps-Oecumenius Theophylact
και νυν αδελφοι ημων εστω — eth

James 1:20

ουκ εργαζεται — א A B C^{c} K Ψ 81
ου κατεργαζεται — C* P 0246 1175 1243 1739 1852 𝔐

James 1:22

νομου (of the law) — C^{c} 88 621 1067 1852
λογου (of the word) — rell

James 1:22

ακροαται μονον — B 1852
μονον ακροαται — 𝔓^{74} א A C P Ψ 81 1175 1243 1739 𝔐

James 1:25

ουκ — א A B C
ουτος ουκ — 𝔐

James 1:26

ειναι — א A B C
ειναι εν υμιν — 𝔐

James 1:27

τω — A B C
omit — א 𝔐

James 1:27

ασπιλον εαυτον τηρειν — א (A) B C K P 049 056 0142 33 81 88 104 181 326 330 (436) 451 629 630 945 1241 1739 1877 2127 2492 𝔐 Lect latt syr^{p} cop arm (eth)
ασπιλους εαυτους τηρειτε — 614 1505 2412 2495 syr^{(h)}
υπερασπιζειν αυτους — 𝔓^{74}

14 Textual variants in James 2

James 2:3

ειπητε — א A B C
ειπητε αυτω — 𝔐

James 2:3

η καθου ωδε — cop^{sa}
η καθου εκει — B 945 1175 1241 1243 1739 1852 2298 2492 𝑙^{809} it^{ff}
η εκει καθου — arm
εκει και καθου — C*
εκει και καθου ωδε — C^{c}
εκει η καθου — A Ψ 33 81 614 630 1292 1505 1611 2138 2412 2495 𝑙^{591} lat syr^{h} geo Augustine Cyril Hesychius
εκει η καθου ωδε — 𝔓^{74}^{vid} א K L P 049 056 0142 88 104 181 322 323 326 330 436 451 629 1067 1409 1735 1877 2127 2344 2464 𝔐 Lect syr^{p} cop^{bo} eth slav Ps-Oecumenius Theophylact

James 2:4

ου — א A B^{c} C 33 81 614 630 945 1175 1241 1243 1739 2495
ουχι — Ψ
και ου — P 307 𝔐
και — 322 323
omit — B* 1852 (vg)

James 2:5

τω κοσμω — א A B C
του κοσμου — 𝔐

James 2:10

τηρηση πταιση — א B C
πληρωσει πταιση — A
τηρησει πταισει — 𝔐

James 2:11

μοιχευεις φονευεις — א A B C
μοιχευσεις φονευσεις — 𝔐

James 2:11

κατακαυχαται ελεος — א B
κκατακαυχασθω δε ελεος — A
κατακαυχαται ελεον — C 𝔐

James 2:15

λειπομενοι — א B C
λειπομενοι ωσιν — A 𝔐

James 2:18

χωρις των εργων καγω σοι δειξω — א B
χωρις των εργων καγω δειξω σοι — A
χωρις των εργων σου καγω δειξω σοι — C
εκ των εργων σου καγω δειξω σοι — 𝔐

James 2:18

πιστιν — א B C
πιστιν μου — A 𝔐

James 2:19

εις εστιν ο θεος — 𝔓^{74} א A 1735 2464 𝑙^{596} it^{ar,c,dem,div,p,s,z} vg syr^{p} cop^{sa,bo} arm eth geo Augustine Cyril^{pt} Salvian^{pt} Faustus Caesarius^{pt} Anastasius^{pt}
εις εστιν θεος — 945 1241 1739 2298
εις θεος εστιν — B 614 630 1292 1505 1611 1852 1875 2138 2412 2495 Theophylact
εις ο εστιν θεος — C 33^{vid} 81 1175 1243 2344 2492 syr^{h}
ο θεος εις εστιν — K^{c} L 049 056 0142 88 104 181 322 323 326 436 629 1067 1409 1877 𝔐 Lect vg^{ms} slav Didymus Cyril^{pt} Salvian^{pt} Caesarius^{pt} Ps-Oecumenius
θεος εις εστιν — 330 451 2127
εις ο θεος — Cyril
εστιν θεος — Ψ Ps-Athanasius
εις ο θεος — it^{ff} vg^{mss} Cyril^{pt}

James 2:20

αργη — B C* 322 323 945 1175 1243 1739 it^{ar,c,dem,div,s,z} vg^{mss} cop^{sa} arm Augustine
νεκρα — א A C^{c} K L P Ψ 049 056 0142 33 81 88 104 181 326 330 436 451 614 629 630 1067 1241 1292 1409 1505 1611 1735 1852 1877 2127 2138 2298 2344 2464 2492 2495 𝔐 Lect it^{p} vg^{mss} syr cop^{bo} eth slav Didymus Cyril Salvian Faustus Ps-Athanasius Ps-Oecumenius Cassiodorus
κενη — 𝔓^{74} it^{ff}

James 2:24

ορατε — א A B C
ορατε τοινυν — 𝔐

James 2:25

αγγελους — 𝔓^{54}^{vid} 𝔓^{74} א A B K P Ψ 33^{vid} 81 322 323 436 1067 1175 1243 1292 1409 1505 1611 1735 1852 2138 2344 𝔐 𝑙^{147} 𝑙^{590} 𝑙^{591} 𝑙^{603} 𝑙^{680} 𝑙^{883} 𝑙^{1159} 𝑙^{1178} it^{ar,s,t} vg syr^{h}
αγγελους του Ισραηλ — 61 syr^{h^{mg}}
αγγελους τους κατασκοπους — 𝑙^{1154}
κατασκοπους — C K^{mg} L 945 1241 1739 2298 2464 Lect it^{ff} syr^{p} cop arm eth geo slav

19 Textual variants in James 3

James 3:2

δυνατος — A B 𝔐
δυναμενος — א

James 3:3

ει δε — א^{2} A B* K L Ψ 049 33 104 181 326 330 436 451 1067 1243 1409 1505 1611 1735 1852 2344 2464 2492 𝑙^{590} 𝑙^{592} 𝑙^{680} 𝑙^{883} 𝑙^{884} 𝑙^{1154} lat cop^{bo} geo Ps-Oecumenius John-Damascus
ιδε — C P 056 0142 81 88 322 323 614 629 630 945 1175 1241 1292 1505 1739 2127 2138 2298 2412 2495 𝔐 Lect syr^{h} cop^{sa} arm slav^{(ms)} Ps-Ambrose Theophylact
ει δε γαρ (ιδε γαρ) — א* syr^{p}
ιδου — 36 483 1874 1877
quare ergo — it^{m}

James 3:3

βαλλομεν εις — א B C
βαλλομεν προς — A 𝔐

James 3:4

ανεμων σκληρων — א B C K P 056 0142 81 307 1175 1243 1852
σκληρων ανεμων — A L Ψ 049 1739 𝔐

James 3:4

οπου — א B
οπου αν — A C 𝔐

James 3:4

βουλεται — א B
βουληται — A C 𝔐

James 3:5

μεγαλα αυχει — A B C
μεγαλαυχει — 𝔓^{20} א 𝔐

James 3:5

ηλικον — א B
ολιγον — A^{vid} C 𝔐

James 3:5

αδικιας η γλωσσα — 𝔓^{20} א A B C
αδικιας ουτως η γλωσσα — 𝔐

James 3:8

δαμασαι δυναται ανθρωπων — 𝔓^{20}^{vid} B C 1739
δυναται δαμασαι ανθρωπων — א A K P Ψ 049 81 307 1175 1852
δυναται ανθρωπων δαμασαι — 𝔐

James 3:8

ακαταστατον — א A B K P 1175 1243 1735 1739* 2298 it^{ar,ff,t} vg syr^{p} cop Jerome^{pt}
ακατασχετον — C L Ψ 81 322 323 436 945 (1067) 1241 1292 1409 1505 1611 1739^{c} 1852 2138 2344 2464 𝔐 Lect syr^{h} eth geo slav Epiphanius Jerome^{pt} Cyril Flavian-Constantinople Speculum Cassiodorus John-Damascus

James 3:9

κυριον — 𝔓^{20} א A B C P Ψ 33 81 623 945 1175 1241 1735 1739 1852 it^{ar,ff,t} vg^{mss} syr^{p} cop^{bo^{mss}} arm Cyril
θεον — K L 322 323 436 1067 1243 1292 1409 1505 1611 2138 2298 2344 2464 𝔐 Lect it^{s} vg^{mss} syr^{h} cop^{sa,bo^{mss},ach} geo slav Epiphanius Jerome Augustine John-Damascus

James 3:12

ουδε αλυκον — 88
ουτε αλυκον — A B C* 1175 1243 1852 2492 syr^{h} cop^{sa} arm (John-Damascus)
ουτως αλυκον — 2492^{mg}
ουτως ουδε αλυκον — א 81 322 323 1739 2344 latt syr^{p} cop^{bo} (eth) geo Cyril
ουτως ουτε αλυκον και — 1735
ουτως ουτε αλυκον — C^{c} Ψ
ουτως και αλυκον — 1241
ουτως ουδε ουδε αλυκον — 33
ουτως ουδεμια ποα αλυκον και — 1067
ουτως ουδεμια πηγη αλυκον και — K L 049 056 0142 104 181 326 330 436 451 614 629 630 917 945 1292 1409 1611 1877 2127 2298 2412 𝔐 Lect syr^{h^{mg}} slav Ps-Oecumenius Theophylact
ουδεμια πηγη αλυκον και — 1505 2492
ουτως ουτε πηγη αλυκον και — 2464
ουτως ουτε μια πηγη αλυκον και — P 1505 2138

James 3:14

εριθειαν — 𝔐
ερειθειαν — 𝔓^{100}

James 3:14

ψευδεσθε — 𝔐
ψευδευσθε — 𝔓^{100}

James 3:15

επιγειος — 𝔐
επιγιος — 𝔓^{100}

James 3:16

ακαταστασια — 𝔐
ακαστασια — 𝔓^{100}

James 3:17

αδιακριτος — א A B C
αδιακριτος και — 𝔓^{100} K L 049 69 322 323 𝔐

James 3:18

δικαιοσυνης — A B C
της δικαιοσυνης — 𝔐
ο δικαιοσυνης — א

25 Textual variants in James 4

James 4:1

ποθεν μαχαι — א (A) B C
μαχαι — 𝔐

James 4:1

υμιν — 𝔐
υμειν — 𝔓^{100}

James 4:2

ουκ εχετε δια — 𝔓^{100} A B 𝔐
και ουκ εχετε δια — א

James 4:3

αιτεισθε — 𝔐
αιτειτε — 𝔓^{100} 69 631

James 4:4

μοιχαλιδες — 𝔓^{100} א* A B 33 81 1175* 1241 1739 1852 latt syr^{p} cop arm eth geo Augustine
μοιχοι και μοιχαλιδες — א^{c} K L P Ψ 049 056 0142 88 104 181 (322) 323 326 330 436 451 614 629^{c} 630 945 1067 1175^{c} 1243 1292 1409 1505 1611 1735 1877 2127 2138 2298 2344 2464 2492 2495 𝔐 Lect syr^{h} slav Ps-Oecumenius Theophylact
μοιχοι — 629*^{vid}

James 4:4

εαν — א B
αν — A 𝔐

James 4:5

κατωκισεν — 𝔓^{74} א B Ψ 049 104 226 241 462 547 807 1241 1739 1877* slav
κατωκησεν — K L P 056 0142 32 33 88 181 322 323 326 330 436 451 614 629 630 945 1067 1243 1292 1409 1505 1611 1735 1852 1877^{c} 2127 2138 2298 2344 2412 2492 2495 𝔐 Lect latt syr^{(p),h} cop arm eth geo Nilus Ps-Oecumenius Theophylact
κατωκεισεν — A 81 1175 2464 𝑙^{680}

James 4:7

δε — א A B 𝔐^{pt}
omit — 𝔐^{pt}

James 4:9

μετατραπητω — 𝔓^{100} B P 614 1241 1739
μεταστραφητω — א A 𝔐

James 4:9

κατηφειαν — 𝔐
κατηφιαν — 𝔓^{100}

James 4:11

η — 𝔓^{100} א A B
και — 𝔐

James 4:11

κρινων — 𝔐
κρεινων — 𝔓^{100}

James 4:11

νομον — 𝔐
νον — 𝔓^{100}

James 4:12

νομοθετης — 𝔓^{74} 𝔓^{100} B P 1175 1241*^{vid} 1243 1852 arm geo Cyril^{pt}
ο νομοθετης — א A K L Ψ 33 81 322 323 436 945 1067 1241^{c, vid} 1292 1409 1505 1611 1735 1739 2138 2298 2344 2464 𝔐 Lect cop eth Didymus Cyril^{pt} John-Damascus

James 4:12

και κριτης — א A B
omit — 𝔐

James 4:12

ο κρινων — 𝔓^{100} א A B
ος κρινεις — 𝔐

James 4:12

πλησιον — א A B
ετερον — 𝔐

James 4:13

η — א B
και — A 𝔐

James 4:13

πορευσομεθα... ποιησομεν... εμπορευσομεθα και κερδησομεν — 𝔓^{100}^{vid} B P 323 1739
πορευσομεθα... ποιησωμεν... εμπορευσομεθα και κερδησομεν — א
πορευσωμεθα... ποιησωμεν... εμπορευσομεθα και κερδησομεν — A
πορευσωμεθα... ποιησωμεν... εμπορευσωμεθα και κερδησωμεν — 𝔐

James 4:13

ενιαυτον — א B
ενιαυτον ενα — A 𝔐

James 4:14

το της αυριον — א K L Ψ 049 056 0142 104 181 322 323 326 330 436 451 629 1067 1409 1735 1877 2127 2464 𝔐 Lect lat syr^{p} arm (eth) Ps-Oecumenius Theophylact
ττα της αυριον — A P 33 81 614 630 945 1175 1241 1243 1292 1505 1611 1739 1852 2138 2298 2344 2412 2492 2495 syr^{h}
της αυριον — B it^{ff,l} Jerome

James 4:14

ποια — א* B 614 1505 1611 1852 2138 2412 2495 it^{l} syr^{h} cop^{bo^{mss}} arm
ποια γαρ — 𝔓^{74} 𝔓^{100} א^{2} A K L P Ψ 049 056 0142 33 81 88 104 181 322 323 326 330 436 451 629 630 945 1067 1175 1241 1243 1292 1409 1735 1739 1877 2127 2298 2344 2464 2492 𝔐 Lect lat syr^{p} cop^{sa,bo^{mss}} slav Jerome Augustine Ps-Oecumenius Theophylact
ποια δε — it^{ff} eth geo

James 4:14

ατμις γαρ εστε η — 81 104 614 1243 1292 1852 2412 2495 syr^{h} Jerome Ps-Oecumenius
ατμις γαρ εστε — B 322 323 945 1175 1739 2298
ατμις γαρ εσται — P 88 1241 𝑙^{680*} 𝑙^{884}
ατμις εσται η — A it^{ar,c,dem,div,p,s,z}
ατμις εστιν η — 33 1735 2344 vg cop
ως ατμις γαρ εσται η — it^{l} (arm) (eth)
ατμις γαρ εσται η — K Ψ 049 181 326 436 1067 1505 1611 2127 2138 2464 2495 𝔐^{pt} Lect
ατμις γαρ εστιν η — L 056 0142 330 451 629 630 1409 1877 𝔐^{pt} 𝑙^{592} 𝑙^{883} 𝑙^{921} 𝑙^{1159} 𝑙^{1441} it^{ff} slav (Augustine) Bede John-Damascus John-Damascus Theophylact
ατμις γαρ εστιν — 𝑙^{596}
η — א

James 4:14

και — א A B
δε και — 𝔐

James 4:15

ζησομεν και ποιησομεν — א A B
ζησωμεν και ποιησωμεν — 𝔐

21 Textual variants in James 5

James 5:4

αφυστερημενος — א B*
απεστερημενος — A B^{c} P Ψ (33) (81) 322 323 945 1067 1175 1241 1243 1292 1409 1505 1611 1735 1739 1852 2138 2298 2344 2464 𝔐 Lect lat arm (eth) geo slav^{ms} Didymus Cyril John-Damascus
αποστερημενος — K L

James 5:5

υμων — א (A) B
υμων ως — 𝔐

James 5:7

αυτω — א A B
αυτον — 𝔐

James 5:7

εως — A B 𝔐
εως αν — א

James 5:7

λαβη — 𝔓^{74} B 048 945 1241 1739 2298 lat cop^{sa} arm geo
λαβη υετον — A K L P Ψ 049 056 0142 33 81 88 104 181 322 323 326 330 451 614 629 1243 1292 1505 1611 1735 1852 1877 2127 2138 2344 2412 2464 2495 𝔐 Lect vg^{mss} syr^{p,h} geo^{ms} slav Ps-Oecumenius Theophylact
υετον λαβη — 436 1067 1409
λαβη καρπον — א^{c} 255 398 1175 it^{ff} syr^{h^{mg}} cop^{(bo)} Faustus Cassiodorus Antiochus
λαβη καρπον τον — א*

James 5:7

προιμον — א A B
πρωιμον — 𝔐

James 5:9

αδελφοι κατ’ αλληλων — B
αδελφοι μου κατ’ αλληλων — A
κατ’ αλληλων αδελφοι — (א) 𝔐

James 5:10

αδελφοι της κακοπαθιας — (A) B
αδελφοι μου της κακοπαθειας — 𝔐
της κακοπαθιας αδελφοι μου — א

James 5:10

εν — (א) B P 307 1243
omit — A K L Ψ 049 056 0142 81 𝔐

James 5:11

υπομειναντας — א A B
υπομενοντας — 𝔐

James 5:11

ειδετε — א B
ιδετε — A 𝔐

James 5:11

ο κυριος — א A (B)
omit — 𝔐

James 5:12

υπο κρισιν — א A B
εις υποκρισιν — 𝔐

James 5:14

αλειψαντες αυτον — א A (Ψ) 048^{vid} 𝔐
αλειψαντες — B P 1243 it^{ff} vg^{ms} cop^{sa^{mss}}

James 5:14

του κυριου — א K L P 33 322 323 436 945 1175 1241 1243 1292 1409 1505 1611 1735 1739 1852 2138 2298 2344 2464 𝔐 Lect geo (eth) Chrysostom Cyril John-Damascus^{pt}
κυριου — A Ψ 81 1067 𝑙^{751} 𝑙^{921} arm John-Damascus^{pt}
του κυριου or κυριου — lat syr slav Origen^{lat} Hesychius
του κυριου Ιησου — 𝑙^{1356}
Ιησου Χριστου — 6
omit — B

James 5:16

ουν αλληλοις τας αμαρτιας — א A B
αλληλοις τα παραπτωματα — 𝔐

James 5:16

ευχεσθε — א K P Ψ 056 0142 𝔐
προσευχεσθε — A 048^{vid}
προσευχεσθαι — B

James 5:19

μου — א A B
omit — 𝔐

James 5:20

γινωσκετω οτι — א A K L P 049 056 0142 81 88 104 181 322 323 326 330 436 451 614 629 630 945 1067 1175 1241 1243 1292 1409 1611 1735 1739 1846 1852 1877 2127 2298 2344 2412 2464 2492 𝔐 Lect lat syr^{p} cop^{bo^{mss}} arm eth (geo) slav Didymus
γινωσκετε οτι — B 69 1505 1518 2138 2495 syr^{h}
οτι — Ψ Origen^{lat}
omit — 𝔓^{74} it^{ff} cop^{sa}

James 5:20

αυτου εκ θανατου — א A P 048^{vid} 33 436 1067 1409 1735 1739 2298 2344 2464 lat syr copbo arm (eth) Didymus Cyril
εκ θανατου αυτου — 𝔓^{74} B 614 1108 1292 1611 1852 2138 (2412) it^{ff}
εκ θανατου — K L Ψ 049 056 0142 81 88 104 181 322 323 326 330 451 629 630 945 1175 1241 1243 1505 1846 1852 1877 2127 2492 2495 𝔐 Lect cop^{sa} Origen^{lat} Ps-Oecumenius John-Damascus Theophylact
αυτου — Ambrosiaster

James 5:20

αμαρτιων — 𝔐
αμαρτιων αμην — 181 378 614 1518 1765 1898 syr^{h}
αμαρτιων οτι αυτω η δοξα εις τους αιωνας αμην — 330

== First Epistle of Peter ==
1 Textual variants in 1 Peter 1

1 Peter 1:22

ἀληθείας – 𝔓^{72}, א, A, B, C, Ψ, 33, 81, 436, 629, 945, 1241, 1739, 1881, 2492, syr^{p, h}, cop^{sa, bo},
ἀληθείας διὰ πνεύματος – K, P, 049, 056, 0142, 88, 104, 181, 326, 330, 451, 614, 630, 1505, 1877, 2127, 2412, 2495, Byz, Lect
fidei per spiritum – it^{m}
caritatis – it^{ar, c, dem, div, p, z}, vg

0 Textual variants in 1 Peter 2

1 Peter 2:1

1 Textual variants in 1 Peter 3

1 Peter 3:15

τὸν Χριστόν – 𝔓^{72}, א, A, B, C, Ψ, 326^{mg}, 614, 630, 945, 1739, 1881, 2412, it, vg, syr, cop^{sa, bo}, arm
τὸν Θεόν – K, L, P, 049, 056, 0142, 81, 88, 104, 181, 326^{txt}, 330, 436, 451, 1241, 1505, 1877, 2127, 2492, 2495, Byz, Lect
τὸν Θεόν ἡμῶν – ℓ 1441

0 Textual variants in 1 Peter 4

1 Peter 4:1

1 Textual variants in 1 Peter 5

1 Peter 5:13

ἐν Βαβυλῶνι (in Babylon) – majority of mss
ἐν Ρωμη (in Rome) – 2138
ἐν ἐκκλησια (in church) – א, vg^{mss}, syr^{p}

== Second Epistle of Peter ==
1 Textual variants in 2 Peter 1

2 Peter 1:3

ἰδίᾳ δόξῃ καί ἀρετῇ – א, A, C, P, Ψ, 33, 81, 88, 104, 436, 614, 629, 630, 945, 1241, 1505, 1739, 1881, 2412, 1495, it, vg, syr, cop^{sa, bo}, arm
διὰ δόξης καί ἀρετῆς – 𝔓^{72}, B, K, L, 049, 056, 0142, 0209^{vid}, 181, 330, 451, 1877, 2492, Byz, Lect, ℓ 598^{m}, ℓ 1365^{m}
per propria gloria et virtute – it^{z}

1 Textual variants in 2 Peter 2

2 Peter 2:15

Βοσορ – 𝔓^{72}, א^{c}, A^{c}, C, K, Ψ, 048, 049, 056, 0142, 81, 88, 104, 181, 326, 330, 436, 451, 614, 630, 945, 1241, 1505, 1739, 1877, 1881, 2127, 2412, 2492, Byz, Lect, it, vg
Βοσυρ – 2495
Βεωρ – B, 453, vg^{mss}, syr^{ph}, cop^{sa}, arm
Βεωορσορ – א*

0 Textual variants in 2 Peter 3

2 Peter 3:1

== First Epistle of John ==
2 Textual variants in 1 John 1

1 John 1:4

ἡμῶν] (our) – א, B, L, Ψ, 049, 69, 88, 181, 322, 326, 436, 1067, 1175, 1241, 1409, pm, Lect, it^{ar}, it^{p}, it^{t(pt),}, it^{z}, vg^{ww}, vg^{st}, cop^{sa}, geo, Ps-Oecumenius^{comm}, Theophylact^{comm}, TR^{Stephens 1550}, WH
ὑμῶν] (your) – (see John 16:24) A, C, K, P, 056, 0142, 5, 6, 33, 81, 104, 323, 330, 442, 451, 468, 614, 629, 630, 945, 1241, 1292, 1505, 1611, 1735, 1739, 1844, 1852, 1877, 1881, 2138, 2298, 2344, 2412, 2464, 2495, Byz, l422, l598, l938, l1021, it^{ar}, it^{c}, it^{dem}, it^{div}, it^{t(pt)}, vg^{cl}, syr^{h}, syr^{pal}, cop^{bo}, arm, eth, slav, Augustine, Ps-Oecumenius^{text}, Bede, Theophylact^{text}, TR^{Scrivener 1894} Dio
ἡμῶν ἐν ὑμῖν] syr^{p}

1 John 1:5

αγγελια – A, B, Byz
επαγγελια – C, P, 33, 69, 81, 323, 614, 630, 945, 1241, 1505, 1739, 2495
αγαπη της επαγγελιας – Ψ

0 Textual variants in 1 John 2

1 John 2:1

0 Textual variants in 1 John 3

1 John 3:1

1 Textual variants in 1 John 4

1 John 4:3

τὸν Ἰησοῦν] (Jesus) – A, B, 322, 323, 945, 1241, 1739, (1881 omit τὸν), 2298, it^{c}, it^{div}, it^{p}, it^{q}, it^{z}, vg, cop^{bo}, Irenaeus^{lat}, Irenaeus^{according to 1739mg}, Clement^{according to 1739mg}, Tertullian^{1/2}, Origen^{gr}, Origen^{lat(2/3)}, Lucifer Priscillian^{1/3}, Tyconius^{1/3}, Didymus^{lat}, Cyril^{4/5}, Fulgentius^{1/2}, mss^{according to Socrates}, WH
Ἰησοῦν Χριστόν] (Jesus Christ) – 629*, 1735, it^{ar}, it^{dem}, vg^{mss}, Tertullian^{1/2}, Cyril^{1/5}
τὸν Ἰησοῦν ἐν σαρκὶ ἐληλυθότα] (Jesus is come in the flesh) – Ψ, (33, 2344 ἐληλυθέναι), 81, 436, 630, 1067, 1409, 1505, 1611, 1852, 2138, (2464 omit τὸν), 2495, vg^{ms}, syr^{p}, syr^{h}, arm, geo, Tyconius^{1/3}, Augustine^{2/16}, (Theodoret)
Ἰησοῦν κύριον ἐν σαρκὶ ἐληλυθότα] (Jesus Lord is come in the flesh) – א
τὸν Χριστόν (Christ) – cop^{sa} cop^{bo(mss)}
Ἰησοῦν Χριστόν ἐν σαρκὶ ἐληλυθότα] (Jesus Christ is come in the flesh) – (see 1 John 4:2) K, 056, 0142, 181, 330, (614, 2412 τὸν Χριστόν Ἰησοῦν) 629^{c}, 1243, 1292, 1844, (1846 τὸν Χριστόν), 2127, 2492, Byz^{pt}, Lect, (ℓ^{883} omit ἐν σαρκὶ), it^{l}, eth, slav, (Polycarp), Origen^{lat(1/3)}, (Cyprian), Priscillian^{2/3}, Tyconius^{1/3}, (Tyconius^{1/3}), Ambrose^{2/3}, (Ambrose^{1/3}), Marcus Eremita^{vid}, Augustine^{9/16}, (Augustine^{5/16}), Fulgentius^{1/2}, Ps-Oecumenius, Theophylact
τὸν Ἰησοῦν Χριστόν ἐν σαρκὶ ἐληλυθότα] (Jesus Christ is come in the flesh) – L, 049, 88, 104, 326, 451, 1175, Byz^{pt}, ℓ^{590}, ℓ^{AD}, TR, Dio

2 Textual variants in 1 John 5

1 John 5:6

δι' ὕδατος καὶ αἵματος (through water and blood) – B, K, Ψ, 049, 056, 0142, 181, 330, 451, 629, 1739*, 1881, 2127, Byz, Lect, it, vg, syr^{p}
δι' ὕδατος καὶ πνεύματος (through water and spirit) – 43, 241, 463, 945, 1241, 1831, 1877*, 1891
δι' ὕδατος καὶ πνεύματος καὶ αἵματος (through water and spirit and blood) – P, 81, 88, 442, 630, 915, 2492, arm, eth
δι' ὕδατος καὶ αἵματος καὶ πνεύματος (through water and blood and spirit) – א, A, 104, 424^{c}, 614, 1739^{c}, 2412, 2495, ℓ^{598m}, syr^{h}, cop^{sa}, cop^{bo}, Origen
δι' ὕδατος καὶ αἵματος καὶ πνεύματος ἁγίου (through water and blood and the Holy Spirit) – 61, 326, 1837

1 John 5:7b–8a

== Second Epistle of John ==
24 Textual variants in 2 John

Insciptio

Ιωανου δευτερα (Second of John) — א^{c} B^{c}
omit — א* B*
Ιωαννου επιστολη δευτερα (Second Epistle of John) — rell

2 John 2

ουσαν — 33 642 2344 cop
ενοικουσαν — A 048 1735
μενουσαν — rell

2 John 3

εσται γαρ μεθ’ ημων — 048
εσται δε μεθ’ ημων — 307
και εσται μεθ’ ημων — 2492
εσται μεθ’ ημων — א B P Ψ 0232 33 323 (614) 1241 1739 𝔐^{pt} vg^{mss} syr^{ph} cop^{sa,bo^{mss}}
εσται μεθ’ υμων — 5 81 945 1735^{c} 𝔐^{pt} it^{l} vg^{mss} cop^{bo^{mss}}
omit — A 630 1448 1505 1852 2464 2495 syr^{h}

2 John 3

παρα — A B Ψ 048 0232 81 88 322 323 326 436 442 629 642 1067 1243 1409 1505 1735 1739 1846 1852 2127 2495 𝑙^{596} lat syr^{ph^{mss}} cop^{sa} eth geo
παρα κυριου — א^{c} K L P 049 056 0142 5 33 181 307 330 451 614 630 945 1175 1448 1844 1877 1881 2298 2344 2412 2464 2492 𝔐 Lect vg^{mss} syr cop arm slav Ps-Oecumenius Theophylact
κυριου — א* 1292 1611 1881 2138 𝑙^{680} 𝑙^{883} 𝑙^{884}
omit — 1505 2495 it^{l} vg^{(mss)} Augustine Cassiodorus

2 John 5

καινην γραφω σοι — Ψ 5 81 642* 1852 it^{l} Augustine^{pt}
καινην γραφων σοι — א A 33 69 323 442 614 630 642^{c} 1241^{c} 1243 1505 1611 1739 2344 2495 vg
γραφων σοι καινην — B P 436 1175 1448 1735 2492 𝔐
γραφω σοι καινην — 623 1241* 2464 Augustine^{pt}

2 John 6

η εντολη εστιν — A B K Ψ 0232 5 33 69 323 630 1241 1505 1611 1735 1739 1852 2344 2495 vg syr
εστιν η εντολη — P 048 307 436 442 642 1175 1243 1448 2492 𝔐 Lucifer
εστιν η εντολη αυτου — א 1846

2 John 7

εξηλθον — p74 א A B Ψ 0232 33 81 323 614 630 1241 1739 2495 vg syr cop^{sa} Irenaeus^{lat}
εισηλθον — P 049 1175 1448 𝔐 cop^{bo}

2 John 8

απολησθε — א*
απολητε — 326*
απολεσητε — א^{c} A B Ψ 0232^{c} 81 88 181 322 323 436 614 630 1067 1241 1409 1505 1611 1735 1739 1846 1852 1881 2138 2298 2344 2412 2464 2492 2495 𝑙^{596} 𝑙^{884} 𝑙^{1439} lat syr cop arm eth geo Irenaeus^{(lat)} Lucifer Isidore Ps-Chrysostom Ps-Oecumenius^{comm} John-Damascus Theophylact^{comm}
απολεσωμεν — K L P 049 056 0142 104 330 451 629 945 1175 1844 1877 2127 𝔐 Lect slav Hilary Ps-Oecumenius Theophylact
απολεσομεν — 𝑙^{603}
απολεσωσιν — 𝑙^{883}
αποληθειτε — 326^{c}
απολεσησθε — 1243

2 John 8

ηργασαμεθα — B* 049*^{vid} 181
ειργασομεθα — 2492
εργασωμεθα — 𝑙^{147} 𝑙^{603}
ειργασαμεθα — B^{c} K L P 049 056 0142 104 330 451 629 945 1175 1448 1844 1877 2127 𝔐 Lect syr^{h^{mg}} cop^{sa^{mss}} geo slav Hilary Ps-Oecumenius Theophylact
ειργασθε — 614 2412
ειργασασθε — א A Ψ 048^{vid} 0232^{vid} 5 33 81 88 307 322 323 326 436 442 630 642 1067 1241 1243 1292 1409 1505 1611 1735 1739 1846 1852^{vid} 1881 2138 2298 2344^{vid} 2464 2495 𝑙^{596} 𝑙^{884} 𝑙^{1439} lat syr cop^{sa^{ms},bo} arm eth Irenaeus^{lat} Lucifer Isidore Ps-Chrysostom Ps-Oecumenius^{comm} John-Damascus Theophylact^{comm}

2 John 8

απολαβετε — 33 1292
απολαβητε — א A B Ψ 0232^{vid} 81 88 181 322 323 326 436 614 630 1067 1241 1243 1409 1505 1611 1735 1739 1846 1852 1881 2138 2298 2344 2412 2464 2492 2495 𝑙^{596} 𝑙^{884} 𝑙^{1439} lat syr cop arm eth geo Irenaeus^{(lat)} Lucifer Isidore Ps-Chrysostom Ps-Oecumenius^{comm} John-Damascus Theophylact^{comm}
απολαβωμεν — K L P 049 056 0142 104 330 451 629 945 1175 1844 1877 2127 𝔐 Lect slav Hilary Ps-Oecumenius Theophylact
απολαβομεν — 𝑙^{603}

2 John 9

προαγων — א A B 048 0232 vg^{mss} cop
παραβαινων — P Ψ 5 33 81 307 436 442 642 1175 1243 1448 1611 1735 1739 1852 2344^{vid} 2492 𝔐 it^{l} vg^{mss} syr Lucifer

2 John 9

διδαχη — א A B Ψ 048 33 81 322 323 442 1241 1243 1739 1846 1852 1881 2344 2464 𝑙^{596} it^{c,l} vg^{mss} syr^{h} cop^{sa,bo^{mss}} arm Didymus Fulgentius
διδαχη αυτου — it^{dem,div,p} vg^{mss} syr^{ph^{mss},h} Lucifer
διδαχη του Χριστου — K L P 056 0142 5 88 104 181 307 326 330 436 451 614 629 630 642 945 1067 1175 1292 1409 1448 1505 1611 1735 1844 1877 2127 2138 2298 2412 2492 2495 𝔐 Lect it^{ar} vg^{mss} syr^{ph^{ms}} cop^{bo^{mss}} eth geo slav Augustine^{vid} Ps-Oecumenius Theophylact
δικαιοσυνη του Χριστου — 𝑙^{422}

2 John 11

insert after πονηροις: ecce praedixi vobis ut in diem domini nostri non confundamini — vg^{mss} (Speculum)
insert after πονηροις: ecce praedixi vobis ut in diem domini nostri Iesu Christi non confundamini — vg^{mss}

2 John 12

αλλα ελπιζω γενεσθαι — א B Ψ 442 614 630 1243 1448 1505 1611 1852 2492 2495 vg^{mss} syr^{h}
ελπιζω γαρ γενεσθαι — A 048^{vid} 5 33 81 323 642 1735 1739 2344 vg^{mss}
αλλα ελπιζω ελθειν — P 307 436 1175 𝔐 it^{l} vg^{mss} syr^{ph} cop^{sa,bo^{ms}}

2 John 12

υμων — A B 0142 5 33 81^{vid} 322 323 436 442 1067 1243 1409 1739 1881 2127 2298 2344* 2464 2492 𝑙^{422} 𝑙^{596} 𝑙^{921} it^{l} vg^{mss} cop^{bo} eth slav
ημων — א K L P Ψ 049 056 88 104 181 307 326 330 451 614 629 630 642 945 1175^{vid} 1292 1448 1505 1611 1735 1844 1846 1852 1877 2138 2412 2495 𝔐 Lect vg^{mss} syr arm geo Ps-Oecumenius Theophylact
εμου — cop^{sa}
omit — 309 327 378

2 John 13

τοις εκλεκτοις — 1067
της εκλεκτης — א A B P Ψ 33 81 88 104 322 323 1243 1409 1735 1739 1846 1881 2127 2298 2344 2464 2492 lat cop geo Bede
της εκλεκτης αμην — K L 049 056 0142 181 326 330 451 614 630 945 1175 1292 1505 1611 1844 1852 1877 2138 2412 2495 𝔐 Lect vg^{mss} slav
της εκκλησιας αμην — 307 vg^{mss}
της εκλεκτης η χαρις μετα σου — 442
της εκλεκτης η χαρις μετα σου αμην — 429 629 1758 1831 𝑙^{596} vg^{mss} arm
της εκλεκτης η χαρις μεθ’ υμων — arm eth^{mss}
της εκλεκτης η χαρις μεθ’ υμων αμην — syr eth^{mss} Ps-Oecumenius Theophylact
electe ecclesia — it^{p}
της εκλεκτης της εν Εφεσω — 465^{mg}
omit — 436

== Third Epistle of John ==
24 Textual variants in 3 John

Insciptio

Ιωανου τριτη (Third of John) — א^{c} B^{c}
omit — א* B*
Ιωαννου τριτη επιστολη (Third Epistle of John) — 18
Ιωαννου επιστολη τριτη (Third Epistle of John) — rell

3 John 3

γαρ — A B C K P Ψ 048 049 056 0142 69 88 93 181 326 330 431 436 442 451 614 629 630 945 1243 1505 1739 1845 1846 1877 1881 2412 2492 𝔐 Lect it^{ar} syr cop^{bo^{mss}} Ps-Oecumenius Theophylact
ουν — 1241
omit — א 6 33 81 104 623 2127 2344 2464 2495 lat cop arm eth Cassiodorus

3 John 3

μαρτυρουντων — 𝔐
μαρτυρουν — B

3 John 4

χαραν — 1844^{c}
χαριν — 1844*
εχω χαραν — 614
ουκ εχω χαραν — א A K L P Ψ 048 049 056 0142 33 81 88 104 181 326 330 436 451 629 630 945 1067 1175 1292 1409 1505 1611 1735 1846 1852 1877 2127 2138 2344 2412 2464 2495 𝔐 Lect it^{ar^{mg},p} vg^{mss} syr cop^{sa} arm eth geo slav (Cassiodorus)
χαραν ουκ εχω — C (69) 322 323 1241^{vid} 1739 1881 𝑙^{(422)} 𝑙^{596}
ουκ εχων χαριν — B*
χαριν ουκ εχω — 1243 2298
ουκ εχω χαριν — B^{c} 5 57 1891 2143 2298 2492 it^{ar,c,dem,div,l} vg cop^{bo} Hilary

3 John 4

τη — A B C* 33 81^{vid}
omit — א C^{c} P Ψ 1739 𝔐 cop^{bo}

3 John 5

τουτο — א A B C Ψ 048 33^{vid} 323 1241^{vid} 1739 it^{l} (vg) syr^{h} cop
εις τους — P 𝔐
τους — 81

3 John 7

ονοματος αυτου — Ψ 614 630 1846 2495 vg^{mss} syr
ονοματος — rell

3 John 7

εθνικων — א A B (C) Ψ 33^{vid} 630 1505 1739 1881 it^{l} Jerome
εθνων — P 𝔐 vg

3 John 8

υπολαμβανειν — א A B C* Ψ 33 81 323 1739
απολαμβανειν — C^{c} P 𝔐

3 John 8

τη αληθεια — 𝔐
της αληθειας — 614 623 630 1505 it^{l} vg
τη εκκλησια — א* A

3 John 9

εγραψα τι — א* A 048^{vid} 442 1241 1739 2298 𝑙^{596} it^{(l)} cop^{bo^{mss}} arm (Jerome)
εγραψας τι — B cop^{sa,bo^{mss}}
εγραψα αν — א^{c} 33 81 181 436 614 630 945 1067 1243 1292 1409 1505 1735 1881 2138 2344 2412 2492 𝑙^{422} 𝑙^{1439} lat (syr) Hilary
εγραψα αν τι — 322 323 424^{c} 1611* 𝑙^{1178}
εγραψα αυτη — 326^{c}
εγραψα — C K L P Ψ 049 056 0142 69 88 93 104 326* 330 451 623 629 1175 1611^{c} 1844 1845 1846 1852 1877 2127 2495 𝔐 Lect (eth) geo slav Ps-Oecumenius Theophylact

3 John 10

εκ — A B C 6 33 69 93 623 1845 1852 2344 𝔐
omit — א 048 049 614 630 1243 1505 1739 2492

3 John 10

επιδεχομενους — C 323 1241 1243 1739 1881 2298 vg^{mss}
βουλομενους — rell

3 John 11

κακοποιων — 𝔐
δε κακοποιων — L 1852 vg^{mss} cop

3 John 12

αληθειας (truth) — p74^{(c)} א A^{c} B P Ψ 049 33 1739 𝔐 it vg syr^{h} cop
εκκλησιαις (church) — 𝔓^{74}^{vid} A*^{vid}
εκκλησιαις και της αληθειας (church and truth) – C syr^{ph,h^{mg}}

3 John 12

οιδας — א A B C Ψ 048 33 81 323 614 1241 1739 it^{d} vg syr^{ph} cop
οιδατε — P 𝔐 vg^{ms} syr^{h}
οιδαμεν — 2143 cop^{bo^{ms}}

3 John 13

σοι γραψαι — 048^{vid}
γραψαι σοι — א A B C Ψ 81 323 630 945 1505 1739
γραφειν — P 307 642 1175 2492 (2495) 𝔐

3 John 13

σοι γραφειν — א B C
γραφειν σοι — A Ψ 048 0251^{vid} 33^{vid} 81 323 630 1241 1505 1739
σοι γραψαι — P 𝔐

3 John 14

σε ιδειν — A B C 048^{vid} 5 33 81 323 436 1241 1243 1735 1739
ιδειν σε — א P Ψ 307 442 642 1175 1448 1611 1852 2492 𝔐

3 John 14

λαλησαι σοι — 442 1735
λαλησαι — 81 it^{d} vg^{mss}
λαλησωμεν — 307 1243 vg^{ms}
λαλησομεν — rell

3 John 15

αδελφοι παντες — 1735
αδελφοι — A 33 81 436 642 syr^{ph,h^{mg}}
φιλοι — rell

3 John 15

ασπασαι — א 048^{vid}
ονομα — rell

3 John 15

αδελφους — 436 1448 1611 syr^{h} cop^{bo^{ms}}
φιλους σου — Ψ
φιλους — rell

3 John 15

ονομα αμην — L 307 321 378 467 614 1836 1837 1838 1852 vg^{mss}
ονομα — rell

== Epistle of Jude ==
82 Textual variants in Jude

Insciptio

Ιουδα καθολικη επιστολη (Catholic Epistle of Jude) — 18
Ιουδα (Jude) — א^{c} B^{c}
omit — א* B*
Ιουδα επιστολη (Epistle of Jude) — 𝔓^{72} A rell

Jude 1:1

Ιησου Χριστου δουλος — 𝔓^{72} א A B K L P Ψ 056 0142 5 18 3 35 61 81 88 93 254 307 323 326 436 442 453 621 623 630 665 909 915 1241 1243 1409 1505 1611 1678 1739 1837 1845 1852 1875 2200 2298 2344 2805 𝔐 Lect
Χριστου Ιησου — K P 049 6 181 431 468 808 1501 1836 2374
δουλος Ιησου Χριστου — 1881
Χριστου δουλος — 1067

Jude 1:1

τοις — 𝔓^{72} א A B K L P Ψ 049 056 0142 5 18 33 35 61 81 88 93 181 254 307* 326 431 436 442 453 468 621 623 630 665 808 909 915 1067 1175 1409 1501 1678 1735 1836 1837 1844 1845 1846 1875 2200 2298 2344 2374 2805 𝔐 Lect lat cop (eth) geo slav Origen Lucifer Augustine (Cassiodorus)
τοις εθνεσιν — 6 307^{c} 322 323 945 1241 1243 1292 1505 1611 1739 1881 2138 syr arm

Jude 1:1

ηγαπημενοις — 𝔓^{72} א A B Ψ 5 81 88 326^{mg} 330 436 442 451 468 621 623 629 630 915 1067 1241 1243 1292 1409 1505 1611 1739 1845 1846 2138 2200 2298 2344 2492 2495 2805 𝑙^{596} 𝑙^{1141} lat syr cop arm eth geo Origen Lucifer Ephraem Augustine Ps-Athanasius Ps-Oecumenius Cassiodorus Theophylact^{comm}
ηγιασμενοις — K L P 049 056 0142 6 18 35 61 93 104 181 254 307 322 323 326 424 431 453 614 665 808 909 945 1175 1501 1678 1735 1836 1837 1844 1875 1877 1881 2127 2374 2412 𝔐 Lect slav Theophylact
ηγαποιμενοις — 1241
electis — Hilary

Jude 1:1

και Ιησου Χριστω τετηρημενοις — 𝔓^{72} א A B L P 049 056 0142 5 6 18 81 35 1307 322 323 326 436 454 468 623 808 909 945 1067 1241 1243 1409 1501 1678 1739 1837 1845 1846 1852^{vid} 1881 2298 2344 𝔐 Lect^{pt} it^{ar} vg^{mss} cop (eth) slav Origen Lucifer Augustine (Cassiodorus)
και Ιησου Χριστου τετηρημενοις — K 93 181 254 431 665 1175 1735 1836 1844 2374 𝑙^{156} 𝑙^{592}(1/2) 𝑙^{883} 𝑙^{884} 𝑙^{1178}
και Χριστου Ιησου τετηρημενοις — 1852
και Χριστω Ιησου τετηρημενοις — Ψ 442 621 2805 𝑙^{596} vg^{mss} syr^{ph} arm geo
και εν Χριστω Ιησου τετηρημενοις — 61 88 915
omit — 630 1292 1505 1611 1875 2138 2200 syr^{h}

Jude 1:2

και ειρηνη και αγαπη — 𝔓^{72} א A B L P Ψ 049 5 6 18 35 81 93 254 307 323 326 431 436 442 453 468 621 623 665 808 909 1067 1241 1243 1409 1501 1678 1739 1837 1845 1875 1881 2298 2344 2374 𝔐 Lect
ειρηνη και αγαπη — K 056 0142
και ειρηνη εν κυριω και αγαπη — 630 1506 1611 2200
και αγαπη και ειρηνη — 33^{vid} 61
και ειρηνη — 88 181 915 1836 2805

Jude 1:3

ποιουμενος — א Ψ^{c} A B C K L P 049 056 0142 5 6 18 33^{vid} 35 61 81 88 93 181 254 307 323 326 431 436 442 453 468 621 623 630 665 808 909 915 1067 1241 1243 1409 1505 1611 1678 1739 1836 1837 1845 1875 1881 2200 2298 2344^{vid} 2374 2805 𝔐 Lect
ποιουμενοι — Ψ*
ποιησαμενος — 𝔓^{72} 1501

Jude 1:3

γραφειν — A B C K L P 049 056 0142 5 6 18 33^{vid} 35 61 81 88 181 254 307 323 326 431 436 442 453 468 623 630 808 909 915 1067 1243 1409 1501 1505 1611 1678 1739 1836 1837 1845 1875 1881 2200 2298 2344^{vid} 2374 2805 𝔐 Lect
του γραφειν — 𝔓^{72} א Ψ
τουτο γραφειν — 93 665
γραφω — 621 1241

Jude 1:3

ημων — 𝔓^{72} א A B Ψ 5 61 81 88 93 307 322 323 326 431 436 442 453 614 621 623 630 665 915 1067 1243 1292 1409 1611 1678 1735 1739 1837 1845 1846 2138 2200 2344^{vid} 2412 𝑙^{6} 𝑙^{596} vg^{mss} syr cop^{sa} arm eth geo slav Lucifer Cyril Bede Theophylact
ημετερας — 𝑙^{422}
σωτηριας ημων — 𝑙^{884}
υμων — 6 104 254 1505 1844 1881 2298 2495 2805 it vg^{mss} cop^{bo} Hilary Ephraem
omit — K L P 049 056 0142 18 35 181 330 451 468 629 808 909 945 1175 1501 1836 1877 1875 2127 2492 2374 𝔐 Lect^{pt} Ps-Oecumenius Cassiodorus

Jude 1:3

σωτηριας — 𝔓^{72} A B C K L P 049 056 0142 5 6 18 35 61 81 88 93 181 254 307 323 326 431 436 442 453 468 621 623 630 665 808 909 915 1067 1243 1409 1501 1678 1739 1836 1837 1845 1875 1881 2200 2298 2344^{vid} 2374 2805 𝔐 Lect
ζωης — 1505 1611 syr eth
σωτηριας και ζωης — א Ψ

Jude 1:3

γραψαι — 𝔓^{72} A B C K L P 049 056 0142 5 6 18 35 61 81 88 93 181 254 307 323 326 431 436 442 453 468 621 623 630 665 808 909 915 1067 1241 1243 1409 1501 1611 1678 1739 1836 1837 1845 1875 1881 2200 2298 2344 2374 2806 𝔐 Lect
γραφειν — א Ψ 1505

Jude 1:3

επαγωνιζεσθαι — א B C K L P Ψ 049 056 0142 5 6 18 33 35 61 81 88 181 254 307 323 326 431 436 442 453 468 621 623 630 665 808 909 1067 1241 1243 1409 1501 1505 1611 1678 1739 1836 1837 1845 1852^{vid} 1875 1881 2200 2298 2344 2374 2806 𝔐 Lect
επαγωνιζεσθε — 𝔓^{72} A 93 915

Jude 1:3

παραοθειση πιστει — 𝔓^{72}*
παραδοθειση — 𝔓^{72}^{c} א A B C K L P Ψ 049 056 0142 5 6 18 33 35 61 81 88 93 181 254 307 323 326 436 442 453 468 621 623 630 665^{mg} 808 909 915 1067 1243 1409 1501 1505 1611 1678 1739 1836 1837 1845 1875 1881 2200 2298 2344 2374 2806 𝔐 Lect
παραδοθησει — 1241
περιδοθειση — 431
δοθειση — 665

Jude 1:4

παρεισεδυσαν — 𝔓^{72} א A K L P Ψ 049 056 0142 5 6 18 33 35 61 81 88 93 181 254 307 323 326 431 436 442 453 468 621 623 630 665 808 909 915 1241 1243 1409 1501 1505^{vid} 1611 1678 1739 1836 1837 1845 1852^{vid} 1875 1881 2200 2298 2344 2374 2805 𝔐 Lect
παρεισεδυησαν — B C^{vid}
παρεδυσαν — 1067

Jude 1:4

οι και — א
οι — rell

Jude 1:4

προγεγραμενοι — 𝔓^{72}
προγεγραμμενοι — rell

Jude 1:4

κριμα — 𝔓^{72}^{c} א A B C^{vid} K L P 049 056 0142 0251^{vid} 5 6 18 33 35 61 81 88 93 181 254 307 323 326 431 436 442 453 468 621 623 630 665 808 909 915 1067 1241 1243 1409 1501 1505^{vid} 1611 1678 1739 1836 1837 1845 1875 1881 2200 2298 2344 2374 2805 𝔐 𝑙^{596}
κρισμα — 𝔓^{72}*
κηρυγμα — Ψ

Jude 1:4

τη — 𝔓^{72}*
την — rell

Jude 1:4

χαριτα — 𝔓^{72} A B
χαριν — א C K L P Ψ 049 056 0142 0251^{vid} 5 6 18 33 35 61 81 88 93 181 254 307 323 326 431 436 442 453 468 621 623 630 665 808 909 915 1067 1241 1243 1409 1501 1505 1611 1678 1739 1836 1837 1845 1852 1875 1881 2200 2298 2344 2374 2805 𝔐 Lect

Jude 1:4

νομον — 𝔓^{72}*
omit — 𝔓^{72}^{c}
μονον — rell

Jude 1:4

δεσποτην — 𝔓^{78} א A B C 0251 6 33 61 81 93 307 322 323 326* 326^{c} 431 436 442 453* 621 808 1067 1241 1243 1409 1678 1739 1837 1845 1846 1881 2344 2805 Lect^{pt} lat cop arm eth geo Lucifer Didymus Cyril
ημων δεσποτην — 𝔓^{72}
δεσποτην θεον — K L P Ψ 049 056 0142 5 18 35 88 181 254 326^{c} 453^{c} 468 623 630 665 909 915 945 1175 1292 1501 1505 1611 1735 1836 1844 1875 2138 2200 2298 2374 𝔐 Lect^{pt} syr slav
δεσποτην και θεον — 𝑙^{596}^{pt}
θεον — 𝑙^{593}

Jude 1:4

κυριον — 𝔓^{78}
και κυριον — rell

Jude 1:4

Ιησουν Χριστον ημων — 𝔓^{72}
υμων Ιησουν Χριστον — 1241
ημων Ιησουν Χριστον — 𝔓^{78} א A B C K L Ψ 049 0142 0251^{vid} 5 6 18 33 35 61 81 93 254 307 322 323 326 431 436 442 453 468 621 623 630 665 808 909 945 1067 1175 1243 1292 1409 1501 1505 1611 1678 1735 1739 1844 1845 1846 2138 2200 2298 2344 2374 2805 𝔐 Lect it^{ar} vg^{mss} syr cop arm eth geo slav (Lucifer) Didymus Cyril
ημων Ιησουν — 1837
Ιησουν Χριστον — 88 181 915 1836 1875 1881 𝑙^{422} 𝑙^{593} vg^{mss}

Jude 1:5

δε — 𝔓^{72} 𝔓^{78} א A B K L 049 056 0142 0251 5 18 33 35 61 81 88 181 254 307 326 431 436 442 468 621 623 630 808 909 915 1067 1409 1505 1611 1678 1836 1837 1845 1875 2200 2344 2374 2805 𝔐 Lect
ουν — C Ψ 6 93 323 665 1241 1243 1501 1739 2298 Lucifer
omit — 1881 cop^{bo^{mss}}

Jude 1:5

ειδοτας τουτο υμας — 0142
ειδοτας υμας — א B K L 049 056 18 35 181 254 326 431 468 909 1836 1837 1875 2374 𝔐 Lect
ιδοντας — 33*
ειδωτας — 1241
ειδοτας — 𝔓^{72} A C Ψ 0251 5 6 33^{c} 61 81 88 93 307 323 436 442 453 621 623 630 665 808 915 1067 1243 1409 1501 1505 1611 1678 1739 1845 1881 2200 2344 2805 𝑙^{596} lat
ειδοτας ημας — 2298

Jude 1:5

παντα απαξ γαρ Ιησους — 1739^{mg}
απαξ παντα οτι Ιησους — A B 33 81 2344 it^{dem,div} vg^{mss} (eth) Jerome
απαξ παντα οτι κυριος — Ephraem
απαξ τουτο οτι ο θεος — 5 623^{mg}
απαξ παντα οτι ο θεος — C^{c} 623 2805 vg^{ms} (slav)
απαξ παντας οτι θεος Χριστος — 𝔓^{72}*
απαξ παντα οτι θεος Χριστος — 𝔓^{72}^{c}
παντα οτι κυριος απαξ — א Ψ
παντα οτι ο κυριος απαξ — C* 307 326 431 436 453 630 808 1505 1611 2138 2200 2412 2495 syr^{h}
παντα οτι ο θεος — Lucifer
παντα οτι ο θεος απαξ — 442 621 1243 1845 1846 2492 𝑙^{596} it^{p} vg^{mss} syr^{ph} arm geo Clement^{vid}
παντα οτι Ιησους — Cyril
παντα οτι Ιησους απαξ — 6 93 322 323 665 1241 1501 1739 1881 2298 it^{ar,c} cop Origen^{per 1739}
παντα οτι ο Ιησους απαξ — 88 915
απαξ οτι ο κυριος — 1409
απαξ τουτο οτι ο κυριος — L 049 18 35 61 104 181 254 307 326 330 431 436 451 453 629 808 (909) 945 1067 1175 1292 1678 1836 1837 1844 (1875) 1877 2127 2374 𝔐 Lect^{pt} Ps-Oecumenius Theophylact
απαξ τουτο οτι Χριστος Ιησους — 1735 𝑙^{591}
τουτο απαξ οτι ο κυριος — K 056 𝑙^{593}
απαξ τουτο υμας οτι ο κυριος — 0142

Jude 1:6

τε — 𝔓^{72} א B C K L Ψ 049 056 0142 5 6 18 33 35 61 81 88 93 254 307 323 326 436 442 453 468 623 630 665 808 909 915 1241 1243 1409 1678 1739 1837 1845 1881 2200 2298 2344 2374 2805 𝔐 Lect
δε — A 18 431 621 1067 1501 1505 1611 1836 1875

Jude 1:7

Γομορρα — א A B C K L Ψ 049 056 0142 5 6 18 33 35 61 81 88 93 181 254 307 323 326 431 436 442 453 468 621 623 630 665 808 909 915 1067 1409 1501 1505 1611 1678 1739 1836 1837 1845 1875 1881 2200 2298 2374 2805 𝔐 Lect
Γομορα — 𝔓^{72} 1241 1243 1852 2344

Jude 1:7

τροπον τουτοις — 𝔓^{72} א A B C 5 33 35* 61 81 93 323 326 431 442 621 623 630 665 1241 1243 1505 1611 1739 1837 1881 2200 2298 2344 2374 2805 𝑙^{596}
τουτοις τροπον — K L 049 056 6 18 35^{c} 254 307 436 453 468 808 909 1067 1501 1678^{vid} 𝔐 Lect
τροπον αυτοις — Ψ
αυτοις τροπον — 0142 1409
τροπον — 88 181 915 1836 1845 1875

Jude 1:7

εκπορνευσασαι — 𝔓^{72}^{c} א A B C K L Ψ 049 056 0142^{mg} 5 6 18 33^{c} 35 61 81 88 93 181 254 307 323 326 431 436 442 453 468 621 623 630 665 808 909 915 1067 1241 1501 1505 1611 1678 1739 1836 1837 1845 1875 1881 2200 2298 2344 2374 2805 𝔐 Lect
εκπορνευσασθαι — 𝔓^{72}* 1243
εκπορρνευσασαι — 33*
εκπορευσασαι — 0142
ακολουθησασαι — 1409

Jude 1:7

υπεχουσαι — 𝔓^{72} B C K L Ψ 049 056 0142 5 6 18 33 35 61 81 88 93 254 307 323 326 431 436 442 453 468 621 623 665 808 909 915 1067 1241 1243 1409 1501 1505 1678 1739 1836 1837 1875 1881 2298 2344 2374 2805 𝔐 Lect
υπερεχουσαι — A
επεχουσαι — 𝔓^{78} 630 1611 2200
ουκ εχουσιν — א*
υπεχουσιν — א^{c}
απεχουσαι — 181
υπαρχουσαι — 1845

Jude 1:8

αυτοι — 𝔓^{78}
ουτοι — rell

Jude 1:8

κυριοτητα — 𝔓^{72} 𝔓^{78} A B C K L 049 056 0142 5 6 18 33 35 61 81 88 93 181 254 307 322 323 326 431 436 442 453 468 621 623 630 665 808 909 915 945 1067 1175 1243 1292 1409 1501 1505 1611 1678 1735 1739 1836 1837 1844 1875 1881 2138 2200 2298 2344 2374 𝔐 Lect lat syr cop^{bo} eth geo Clement Origen^{gr} Lucifer Epiphanius Jerome
κυριωτητα — 1241
κυριοτητας — א Ψ 1845 1846 2805 vg^{ms} cop^{sa} arm slav Origen^{lat} Priscillian

Jude 1:8

δοξας — 𝔓^{72} א A B C K L Ψ 049 056 0142 6 18 33 35 61 81 88 93 181 254 307 322 323 326 431 436 442 453 468 621 623 630 665 808 909 915 945 1067 1175 1241 1243 1292 1409 1501 1505 1611 1735 1739 1836 1837 1844 1845 1846 1852 1875 1881 2138 2200 2298 2344 2374 2805 𝔐 Lect
δοξαν — 𝔓^{78} 5

Jude 1:9

οτε — B
ο δε — rell

Jude 1:9

Μιχαης — 𝔓^{72}
Μιχαηλ — rell

Jude 1:9

τοτε — B
οτε — rell

Jude 1:9

Μωυσεως — 𝔓^{72} א B C L 0142* 5 33 61 81 93 181 254 307 326 431 436 442 453 468 621 623 665 808 909 1067 1243 1409 1501 1836 1837 1845 1875 1881 2200* 2344 2374 2805 𝑙^{596}
Μωσεως — A K Ψ 049 056 0142^{c} 6 18 35 88 323 630 915 1241 1505 1611 1739 2200 2298 𝔐 Lect

Jude 1:9

αλλα — 𝔓^{72} A B Ψ 93
αλλ’ — א C K L 049 056 0142 5 6 18 33 35 61 81 88 181 254 307 323 326 431 436 442 453 468 621 623 630 665 808 909 915 1067 1241 1243 1409 1501 1505 1611 1678 1739 1836 1837 1845 1875 1881 2200 2298 2344 2374 2805 𝔐 Lect

Jude 1:9

σοι — 𝔓^{72} א A B^{c} C K L 049 056 0142 5 6 18 33 35 61 81 88 93 181 254 307 326 431 436 442 453 468 621 623 630 665 808 909 915 1067 1243 1409 1501 1505 1611 1678 1836 1837 1845 1875 2200 2298 2344 2374 2805 𝔐 Lect
εν σοι — B*^{vid} Ψ 323 1241 1739 1881

Jude 1:9

κυριος — 𝔓^{72} A B C K L Ψ 049 056 0142 5 6 18 33 35 61 81 88 93 181 254 307 326 431 436 453 468 623 665 808 909 915 1067 1243 1409 1678 1836 1837 1845 1875 2298 2344 2374 𝔐 Lect
ο κυριος — א^{c} 442 621 630 1505 1611 2200 2805 𝑙^{596}
ο θεος — א* 323 1241 1739 1881
κυριος ο θεος — 1501

Jude 1:11

Βαλααμ — א A B C K L Ψ 049 056 0142 5 6 18 33 35 61 81 93 181 254 307 323 326 431 436 442 453 468 621 623 630 665 808 909 1067 1241 1243 1409 1501 1505 1611 1678 1739 1836 1837 1845 1875^{c} 1881 2200 2298 2344 2374 2805 𝔐 Lect
Βαλαμ — 1875*
Βαλλαμ — 𝔓^{72}*
Βαλαακ — 𝔓^{72}^{c}

Jude 1:12

εισιν — 𝔓^{72} א^{c} A B K L Ψ 049 056 0142 5 6 18 33 35 61 81 88 93 181 254 307 323 326 431 436 442 453 468 621 623 630 665 808 909 915 1067 1241 1243 1409 1501 1505 1611 1678 1739 1836 1837 1845 1852 1875 1881 2200 2298 2344 2374 2805 𝔐 𝑙^{596}
εισιν γογγυσται μεμψιμοιροι κατα τας επιθυμιας αυτων πορευομενοι — א* cop^{sa,bo^{mss}}
εισιν γογγυσται μεμψιμοιροι κατα τας ιδιας επιθυμιας αυτων πορευομενοι — C^{c}

Jude 1:12

οι — 𝔓^{72} א^{c} B L Ψ 5 6 33 35* 61 81 88 93 307 323 326 431 442 453 621 623 630 665 915 1241 1243 1505 1611 1678 1739 1837 1845 1852 1881 2200 2298 2344 2374 2805 𝑙^{596}
omit — 𝔓^{74}^{vid} א* A K 049 056 0142 18 35^{c} 181 254 436 468 642 808 909 1067 1175 1409 1501 1836 1875 𝔐 Lect

Jude 1:12

αγαπαις αυτων — lat syr^{ph} cop^{sa^{ms}}
αγαπαις υμων — 𝔓^{72} א B K L Ψ 049 056 0142 5 18 33 35 61 81 93 181 254 307 322 323 326 431 436 442 453 468 621 623 630 665 808 909 945 1067 1175 1241 1292 1409 1501 1505 1611 1678 1735 1739 1836 1837 1844 1875 1881 2138 2200 2298 2344 2374 2805 𝔐 Lect syr^{h} cop eth geo slav Lucifer Ephraem Augustine Palladius
απαταις υμων — A* C^{vid} (1243 ημων) 82 88 378 460 915 1845 1846
απαταις αυτων — A^{c}
ευωχιαις υμων — 6 224^{c}

Jude 1:12

συνευχομενοι — 𝔓^{72}
συνερχομενοι — 1875^{c}
συνευωχουμενοι — א A B K L Ψ 049 056 0142 5 18 33 61 81 181 254 307 326 431 436 442 453 468 621 623 630 808 909 1067 1409 1505 1611 1678 1836 1837 1875* 2200 2344 2374 2805 𝔐 Lect
συνευωχουμενοι υμιν — C 6 88 93 323 665 915 1241 1243 1501 1739 1845 1881 2298

Jude 1:12

εαυτους πεμενοντες νεφελε — 𝔓^{72}^{c}
αυτους πεμενοντες νεφελε — 𝔓^{72}*
εαυτους ποιμαινοντες νεφελαι — rell

Jude 1:12

παντι ανεμω — א
υπο ανεμων — rell

Jude 1:12

παραφερομεναι — 𝔓^{72}^{c} א A C K L 049 5 18 33 61 81 88 93 181 254 307 323 326 431 436 453 468 623 630 665 808 909 915 1067 1409 1241 1243 1505 1611 1678 1739 1836 1837 1881 2200 2298 2344 2374 2805 𝔐 Lect
παραφερομενοι — 𝔓^{72}* B Ψ 442 621 1845 1852 𝑙^{596}
περιφερομεναι — 6 1501
διαφερομεναι — 1875
φερομεναι — 056 0142

Jude 1:13

επαφριζοντα — א A B K L Ψ 049 056 0142 6 18 35 88 181 307 436 453 468 808 909 915 1067 1409 1501 1678 1836 1845 1875 2374 𝔐 Lect
απαφριζοντα — 𝔓^{72} C 5 33 61 81 93 254 323 326 431 442 621 623 630 665 1241 1243 1505 1611 1739 1837 1852 1881 2200 2298 2344 2805 𝑙^{596}

Jude 1:13

πλανηται οις ο ζοφος του — 𝔓^{72} א A C K L Ψ 049 056 0142 5 6 18 33 35 61 81 88 93 181 254 307 323 326 431 436 442 453 468 621 623 630 665 808 909^{c} 915 1067 1243 1409 1501 1505 1611 1678 1739 1836 1837 1845 1852 1875 1881 2200 2298 2374 2805 2344 𝔐 Lect
πλανηται οις οι ο ζοφος του — 909*
πλανητες οις ζοφος — B
πλανηται εις ο ζοφος τους — 1241

Jude 1:13

αιωνα — 𝔓^{72} א A B C L 5 18 33 35 61 81 88 93 181 254 307 323 326 431 436 453 468 621 623 630 665 808 909 915 1067 1243 1409 1505 1611 1678 1739 1836 1845 1852 1875 2200 2298 2374 2805 2344 𝔐 Lect
τον αιωνα — K 049 056 0142 6 1501
αιωνας — Ψ 442 1241 1837 1881

Jude 1:14

προεφυτευσεν — 181
προεφητευσεν — A C K L Ψ 049 056 0142 5 6 18 33 35 61 81 88 93 254 307 323 326 431 436 442 453 468 621 623 630 665 808 909 915 1067 1241 1243 1409 1501 1505 1611 1678 1739 1836 1837 1845 1852 1875 1881 2200 2298 2344 2374 2805 𝔐 Lect
προπροφητευσεν — א
επροφητευσεν — 𝔓^{72} B*
επροεφητευσεν — B^{c}

Jude 1:14

κυριος — 𝔓^{72} A B C K L Ψ 049 056 0142 5 6 18 33 35 81 88 93 254 307 323 431 436 442 453 468 621 623 630 665 808 909 915 1241 1243 1501 1505 1611 1678 1739 1836 1837* 1845 1852 1875 1881 2200 2298 2344 2374 2805 𝔐 Lect
ο κυριος — א 61 181 326 1067 1409 1837^{c}

Jude 1:14

αγιαις μυριασιν αυτου — A B K L 049 056 0142 5 6 18 33 35 81 254 307 431 436 453 468 623 808 909 1067 1409 1501 1678 2344 2374 2805 𝔐 Lect
μυριασιν αγιαις αυτου — C 323 630 1241 1243 1505 1611 1739 1881 2200 2298
αγιαις μυριασιν — 1852
αγιαις μυριασιν αγγελων — Ψ
αγιαις μυριασιν αγγελων αυτου — 61 93 181 326 665 1836 1837
αγιων αγγελων μυριασιν — 𝔓^{72}
μυριασιν αγιων αγγελων — א
μυριασιν αγιων αγγελων αυτου — 88 442 915 1845 𝑙^{596}
μυριασιν αγιων αγγελων αυτου αγιων — 621

Jude 1:15

ελεγξαι — 𝔓^{72} א A B C K L Ψ 049 5 6 18 33 35 61 81 88 93 181 254 307 323 326 431 442 453 468 621 623 630 665 808 909 915 1241 1243 1501 1505 1611 1678 1739 1836 1837 1845 1852 1875 1881 2200 2298 2344 2374 2805 𝔐 Lect
εξελεγξαι — 436 1067 1409

Jude 1:15

παντας ασεβεις — 6 323 1241 1739 1881 2298
παντας τους ασεβεις — A B C Ψ 5 33 61 81 93 307 323 326 431 436 453 468 623 630 642 665 808 1067 1243 1409 1448 1501 1505 1611 1678 1735 1739 1837 1845 2200 2344 2374 2495 2805 vg syr^{h} cop^{bo^{mss}}
τους ασεβεις — 442 621 𝑙^{596}
πασαν ψυχην — 𝔓^{72} א 1852 syr^{ph} cop^{sa,bo^{mss}}
παντας τους ασεβεις αυτων — K L 049 18 35 88 181 254 909 915 1175 1836 1875 2492 𝔐 Lect

Jude 1:15

των εργων ασεβειας αυτων — A B K L 049 056 0142 5 18 33 35 81 88 93 181 254 431 436 468 623 665 808 909 915 1067 1409 1501 1836 1875 2344 𝔐 Lect
εργων ασεβειας αυτων — 61 326 1837
των εργων — א 6 323 1241 1739 1881 2298 2374 2805
των εργων αυτων — C 307 442 453 621 1243 1678 1845 𝑙^{596}
εργων ασεβειων αυτων — 1852
των ασεβειων αυτων — Ψ
των εργων των ασεβειων αυτων — Ψ^{mg} 630 1505 1611 2200

Jude 1:15

περι παντων των — 𝔓^{72}^{mg}
περι παντων — 𝔓^{72}
και περι παντων των — rell

Jude 1:15

σκληρων — 𝔓^{72} A B K L P Ψ 049 056 0142 5 18 35 61 181 254 326 431 436 468 623 642 808 909 1067 1175 1409 1678 1735 1836 1837 1875 2492 𝔐 Lect cop^{bo}
σκληρων λογων — א C 6 33 81 88 93 307 323 442 453 621 630 665 915 1241 1243 1448 1501 1505 1611 1739 1845 1852 1881 2200 2298 2344 2374 2805 𝑙^{596} vg^{mss} syr cop^{sa}

Jude 1:16

αυτων — א A B K Ψ 056 0142 5 33 61 81 88 93 181 254 307 326 431 453 468 623 630 665 909 915 945 1409* 1501 1505 1611 1678 1739 1836 1837 1875 2200 2344 2374 2805 𝔐 Lect
εαυτων — 𝔓^{72}^{c} C L P 049 1 6 18 35 254^{mg} 323 436 442 621 808 1067 1241 1243 1409^{c} 1739 1845 1852 2298 2495 𝑙^{596}^{c}
omit — (𝔓^{72}*

Jude 1:16

και το — א A B C K L P Ψ 049 5 6 18 33 35 61 81 88 93 181 254 307 323 326 431 436 442 453 468 621 623 630 665 808 909 915 1067 1243 1501 1505 1611 1678 1739 1836 1837 1845 1852 1875 1881 2200 2298 2344 2374 2805 𝔐 Lect
και — 𝔓^{72} 056 0142 1490
το — 1241

Jude 1:17

ρηματων των προειρημενων — 𝔓^{72} א B C L P Ψ 049 056 0142 5 18 33 35 61 81 88 93 181 254 307 326 431 436 442 453 468 621 623 665 808 909 915 1067 1243 1409 1678 1836 1837 1845 1852 1875 2344 2805 𝔐 Lect
προειρημενων ρηματων — A 6 323 630 1241 1501 1505 1611 1739 1881 2200 2298 2374 Lucifer

Jude 1:18

ελεγον υμιν — א B L Ψ 61 2344 Lucifer
ελεγον υμιν οτι — 𝔓^{72} A C L^{mg} P 049 056 0142 5 6 18 33 35 81 88 93 181 254 307 323 326 431 436 442 453 468 621 623 630 642 665 808 909 915 1067 1175 1241 1243 1409 1448 1501 1505 1611 1678 1735 1739 1836 1837 1845 1852 1875 1881 2200 2298 2374 2492 2805 𝔐 Lect vg syr
ελεγεν ημιν οτι — K

Jude 1:18

επ’ εσχατου χρονου — 𝔓^{72} B C Ψ 5 623 1243
επ’ εσχατου του χρονου — א A 33 61 254 431 436 630 1067 1409 1505 1611 1837 1845 1852 2200 2495
επ’ εσχατου των χρονων — 6 81 307 323 453 1241 1678 1739 2298 2805 vg^{mss} cop
επ’ εσχατου των ημερων — 1881 (Lucifer)
επ’ εσχατω του χρονου — 326
επ’ εσχατω των χρονων — 326^{mg}
επ’ εσχατων του χρονου — 621 𝑙^{596}
επ’ εσχατων των χρονων — 93 442 665 2344
εν εσχατω τω χρονω — P
εν εσχατω χρονων — 056 0142
εν εσχατω χρονω — 𝔓^{72}^{vid} K L 049 18 35 88 181 468 808 909 915 1836 1875 2374 𝔐 Lect vg^{mss}

Jude 1:18

εσονται εμπαικται — 𝔓^{72} א* C* K (L εμπαιγκται) P 049 056 0142 18 35 88 181 254 442 468 621 630 808 909 915 1243 1505 1611 1678 1836 1845 1852 1875 2200 2374 𝔐 𝑙^{596}
ελευσονται εμπαικται — אc A C 5 6 33 61 81 93 307 323 326 431 436 453 623 665 1067 1241 1409 1501 1739 1837 1881 2298 2344 2805
αναστησονται εμπαικται — Ψ

Jude 1:18

εαυτων εμπιθυμιας — 307
εαυτων επιθυμιας — 𝔓^{72} A B C K L P 049 056 0142 0316 5 6 18 33 35 61 81 88 93 181 254 323 326 431 436 442 453 468 621 623 665 808 909 915 1067 1241 1243 1409 1678 1739 1836 1837 1845 1852 1881 2298 2344 2374 2805 𝔐 Lect
αυτων επιθυμιας — Ψ (1501)
επιθυμιας εαυτων — א^{c} (1875)
επιθυμιας αυτων — א* 630 1505 1611 2200

Jude 1:19

αποδιωριζοντες — 𝔓^{72} K
αποδιοριζοντες — 0316
οι διοριζοντες — א^{c}
οι αποδιοριζοντες — א* A B L P Ψ 049 056 0142 18 33 35^{c} 61 81 93 181 254 307 326 431 436 442 453 468 665 909 945 1067 1175 1241 1409 1501 1678 1735 1739* 1836 1837 1844 1845 1852 1875 2344 𝔐 Lect vg^{mss} arm Clement Lucifer Didymus Cyril
οι αποδιοριζοντες εαυτους — C 5 6 35* 88 322 323 621 623 630 808 915 1243 1292 1505 1506 1611 1739^{c} 1846 1881 2138 2200 2298 2374 2805 Lect it^{ar} vg^{mss} geo slav Augustine Fulgentius
omit — 𝑙^{422}

Jude 1:20

εποικοδομουντες αυτους τη αγιωτατη υμων πιστει — 88*
επωκοδομουντες εαυτους τη αγιωτατη υμων πιστει — 621
εποικοδομουντες εαυτους τη αγιωτατη υμων πιστει — א A B Ψ 0316 5 33 61 81 88^{c} 93 326 436 442 623 630 665 808 915 1067 1243 1505 1611 1837 1845 1881 2200 2374 2805 𝑙^{596}
εποικοδομουντες εαυτους τη αγιωτατη ημων πιστει — C 323 431 1409 1739 1852 2298
εποικοδομουντες εαυτους τη αγιοτητι ημων εν πιστει — 1241
τη αγιωτατη υμων πιστει εποικοδομουντες εαυτους — K L P 049 056 0142 18 35 181 254 468 909 1501 1678 1836 1875 𝔐 Lect
τη αγιωτατη ημων πιστει εποικοδομουντες εαυτους — 6 307 453
τη εαυτων αγιοτητι πιστει ανοικοδομεισθη εαυτους — 𝔓^{72}

Jude 1:20

προσευχομενοι — א A B C L P Ψ 056 0142 0316 5 6 18 33 35 61 81 88 93 181 254 307 323 326 431 436 442 453 468 621 623 630 665 808 909 915 1067 1241 1243 1409 1501 1505 1611 1678 1739 1836 1837 1845 1852 1875 1881 2200 2298 2344 2374 2805 𝔐 Lect
προσευχομενοι εαυτοις — 𝔓^{72}^{c} K 049
προσεχομενοι εαυτοις — 𝔓^{72}*

Jude 1:21

τηρησατε — א A L K P 049 056 0142 0316 5 6 18 33 35 61 81 88 93 254 307 323 326 436 442 453 468 623 630 665 808 909 915 1067 1241 1409 1501 1678 1739 1836 1837 1875 1881 2200 2298 2344 2374 2805 𝔐 Lect vg
τηρησομεν — 1243
τηρησωμεν — 𝔓^{72} B C*^{vid} Ψ 1505 1611 1845 1852 syr cop
τηρησητε — C^{c}
τηρησαντες — 431 621

Jude 1:21

κυριου ημων Ιησου Χριστου εις ζωην — א A B C L K P Ψ 049 056 0142 0316 5 6 18 33 35 61 81 88 93 181 254 307 323 326 431 436 442 453 468 621 623 630 665 808 909 915 1067 1243 1501 1505 1611 1678 1739 1836 1837 1852 1845 1875 1881 2200 2298 2344 2374 2805 𝔐 Lect
ημων Ιησου Χριστου εις ζωην — 1409
κυριου Ιησου Χριστου εις ζωην — 1241
εις ζοην ημων Ιησου Χριστου — 𝔓^{72}

Jude 1:22

ελεειτε διακρινομενους — K^{comm} 1852 𝑙^{1439}
ελεατε διακρινομενους — א B C^{c} Ψ 88 442 621 915 1243 1845 1846 𝑙^{596} 𝑙^{680} syr^{h} geo
ελεγχετε διακρινομενους — A C* 0316 5 6 33 61 81 93 (181 ἐλέγετε) 322 323 326 436 623 665 1067 1241 1409 1611 1735 1739 1836 1837 1875 1881 2298 2344 2374 2805 𝑙^{422} lat cop^{bo} Ephraem Ps-Oecumenius^{comm} Cassiodorus Theophylact^{comm}
ελεγχετε διακρινομενοι — 629
ελεγετε διακρινομενοι — 181 2492
ελεγχεται διακρινομενοι — 1241
ελεειτε διακρινομενω — 1505
ελεειτε διακρινομενοι — K L P 049 056 0142 18 35 104 254 307 330 431 451 454 468 630 808 909 945 1175 1292 1501 1678 1844 1877 2127 2200 2412 2495 𝔐 Lect^{pt} vg^{ms} slav Ps-Oecumenius Theophylact
omit — 𝔓^{72} it^{t} syr^{ph} cop^{sa} Clement Orsiesius Jerome

Jude 1:23

ους δε σωζετε εκ πυρος αρπαζετε — א*
ους δε σωζετε εκ πυρος αρπαζοντες — א^{c} A C Ψ 0316 5 6 33 61 81 93 104 181 307 322 323 326 436 442 453 621 623 630 665 808 1067 1241 1243 (1292) 1409 1505 1678 1735 1739 1836 1837 1845* 1846 1875 1881 2200 2298 2344 2374 2412 2495 2805 𝑙^{156} 𝑙^{422} 𝑙^{596} 𝑙^{617} lat cop^{bo} syr^{h} (arm) (geo) Clement^{lat} Ephraem
ους δε εν φοβω σωζεται εκ πυρος αρπαζοντες — 049 0142
ους δε εν φοβω σωζετε εκ πυρος αρπαζοντες — K L P 056 18 88 35 254 330 431 451 468 629 909 915 945 1175 1611 1844 1845^{c} 1877 2127 2492 𝔐 Lect^{pt} slav Ps-Oecumenius Theophylact
ους δε εν φοβω σωζετε εκ του πυρος αρπαζοντες — 1501
σωζετε εκ πυρος αρπαζοντες — B
εκ πυρος αρπασατε — 𝔓^{72}
εκ πυρος αρπαζετε — it^{t} syr^{ph} cop^{sa} Clement^{gr} Orsiesius Jerome

Jude 1:23

ους δε ελεατε εν φοβω — א A B Ψ 6 33 81 93 181 322 323 326 623 665 1611 1735 1739 1836 1837 1875 1881 2298 2374 lat cop^{bo} arm geo Clement^{lat} Ephraem
τους δε ελεειτε εν φοβω — 0316
ους δε ελεειτε εν φοβω — 5 436 1067 1241 1409 2344
ους δε ελεειτε εν φοβω θεου — 629 it^{p^{(c)}}
ους δε ελεγετε εν φοβω — 2412
ους δε ελεγχετε εν φοβω — 88 104 307 442 453 621 915 945 1678 1845^{c} 1846 𝑙^{596} Ps-Oecumenius^{comm} Theophylact^{comm}
εν φοβω — C 630 1243 1505 1845* 1852 2200
διακρινομενους δε ελεειτε — Clement^{gr} Orsiesius Jerome
διακρινομενους δε ελεειτε εν φοβω — 𝔓^{72} it^{t} syr^{ph} cop^{sa}
omit — K L P 049 056 0142 18 35 254 330 431 451 468 808 909 1175 1292 1844 1877 2127 2492 2495 𝔐 Lect syr^{h} slav Ps-Oecumenius Theophylact

Jude 1:24

φυλαξαι υμας απταιστους και — א B C L Ψ 056 0142 0316 5 6 33 61 81 88 93 181 254 307 326 436 442 453 468 621 623 630 665 808 909 915 1067 1243 1409 1505 1611 1678 1836 1837 1845 1852 1875 2200 2374 2805 𝑙^{596}
υμας φυλαξαι απταιστους και — 323 1241 1501 1739 1881 2298
φυλαξαι υμας απταιστως και — 2344
φυλαξαι ημας απταιστους και — A
φυλαξαι ημας αμεμπτους και — 431
φυλαξαι αυτους απταιστους και — K P 049 18 35 𝔐 Lect
omit — 𝔓^{72}

Jude 1:24

στησαι κατενωπιον — א A B K L P Ψ 049 056 0142 18 33 35 61 81 181 326 431 436 808 909 1067 1409 1836 1837 1875 2344 2374 𝔐 Lect
στηριξαι κατενωπιον — 0316 5 623 2805
στησαι κατεναντι — 88 915
ασπιλους στησαι κατενωπιον — 442 621 𝑙^{596}
ασπιλους και στησαι κατενωπιον — 6 93 307 323 453 468 665 1241 1501 1678 1739 1881 2298
ασπιλους στησαι ενωπιον — C 254 1243 1505 1611 1845 1852
ασπιλους και στησαι ενωπιον — 630 2200
στηριξαι ασπειλους — 𝔓^{72}

Jude 1:25

μονω — 𝔓^{72} א A B C Ψ 0316 6 33 81 88 93 181 322 323 436 442 621 623* 630 665 915 1067 1241 1243 1292 1409 1505 1611 1739 1836 1845 1852 1875 1881 2200 2298 2344 2805 𝑙^{596} lat syr cop arm geo Fulgentius
μονω σοφω — K L P 049 056 0142 5 18 35 61 254 307 326 431 453 468 623^{c} 808 909 945 1175 1501 1678 1735 1837 1844 1846 2374 𝔐 Lect slav

Jude 1:25

δια Ιησου Χριστου του κυριου ω ημων — 𝔓^{72}*
δια Ιησου Χριστου του κυριου ημων — 𝔓^{72}^{c} א A B C L Ψ 0316 5 6 33 61 81 88 93 181 254 307 323 326 436 442 453 621 623 630 665 915 1067 1409 1501 1505 1611 1678 1739 1836 1837 1845 1852 1875 1881 2200 2298 2344 2374 2805 𝑙^{596}
δια Ιησου Χριστου του κυριου υμων — 1241
omit — K P 049 056 0142 18 35 431 468 808 909 1243 𝔐 Lect

Jude 1:25

δοξα — א^{c} A B C 0316 5 33 81 93 254 323 326 431 436 442 623^{c} 630 665 1067 1241 1243 1409 1505 1611 1739 1836 1837 1845 1852 1875 2200 2298 2344 2805 𝑙^{596}
δοξα και — 𝔓^{72} K L P 049 056 0142 6 18 35 61 88 181 307 453 468 621 623* 808 909 915 1501 1678 1881 2374 𝔐 Lect
ω δοξα — א*
omit — Ψ

Jude 1:25

προ παντος του αιωνος — א A B C L Ψ 0316 5 33 61 81 93 181 254 326 378 431 442 467 506 621 623 665 808 1243 1505 1611 1827 1836 1837 1845 1852 1875 2401^{c} 2805 𝑙^{596} vg syr^{h} cop arm (eth) Ephraem
προ παντος αιωνος — 6 88 307 323 436 453 630 915 1067 1241 1409 1501 1678 1739 1881 2200 2298 2344 2374
omit — 𝔓^{72} K P 049 056 0142 18 35 468 909 2401* 𝔐 Lect

Jude 1:25

παντας τους αιωνας — A B C K P Ψ 049 056 0142 5 6 18 35 81 93 181 254 307 323 431 436 453 468 506 623 630 665 808 1067 1243 1409 1501 1505 1611 1678 1739 1845 1852 1875 1881 2200 2298 2374 2401 2805 𝔐 Lect
τους παντας αιωνας — 326^{c}
τους αιωνας παντας — 1837
τους απαντας αιωνας — 326*
τους παντας εωνας — 𝔓^{72}
τους αιωνας — א^{.} 0316 1836
αιωνας παντας — 61
παντας τους αιωνας των αιωνων — L 33 88 442 621 909 915 2344 𝑙^{596}
τους αιωνας των αιωνων — 1241

== Book of Revelation ==
2 Textual variants in Revelation 1

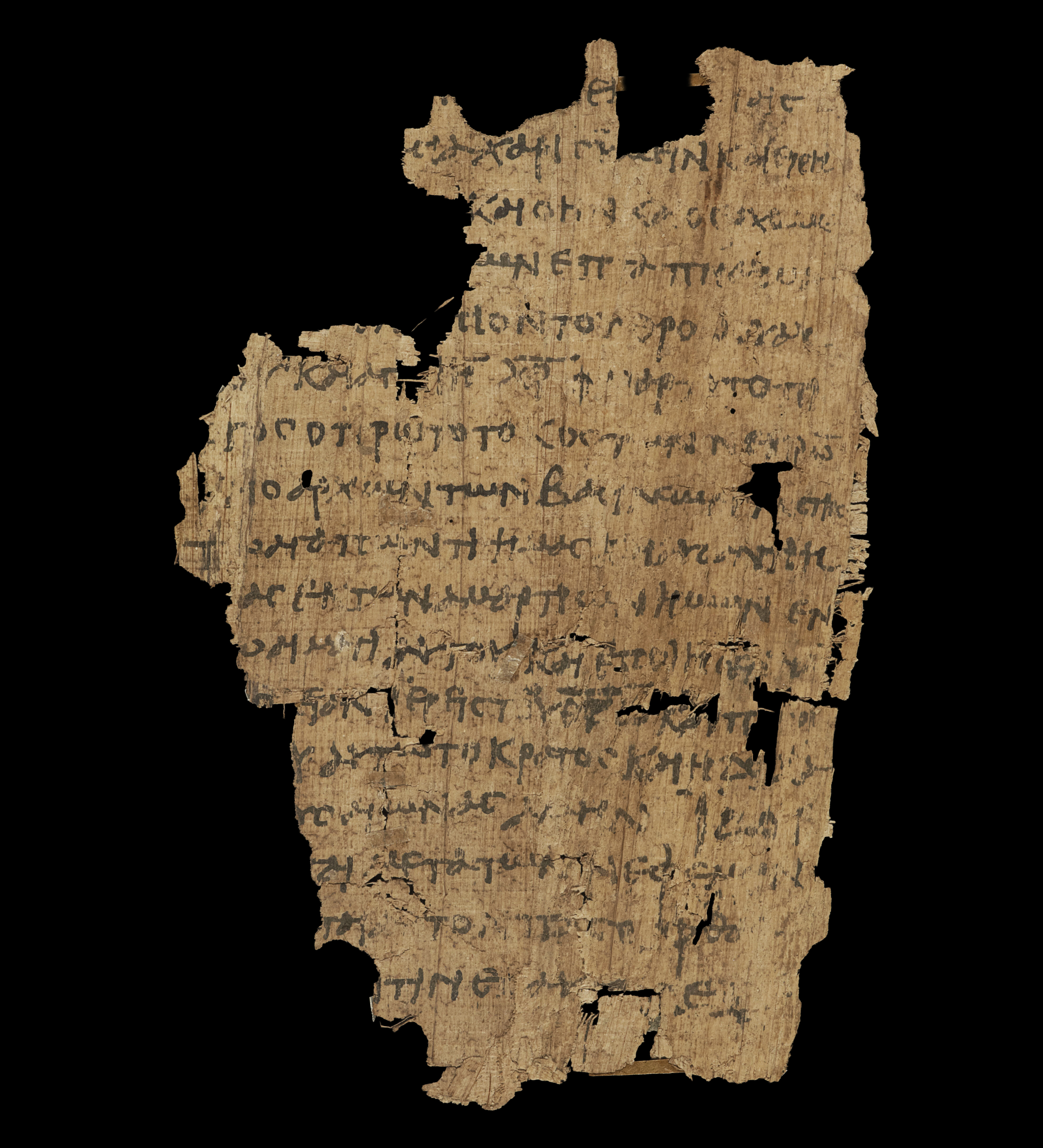
Revelation 1:4-7 in 𝔓^{18}

Revelation 1:5

λυσαντι ημας εκ ('freed us from') – 𝔓^{18}, א^{c}, A, C, 2020, 2081, 2814
λουσαντι ημας απο ('washed us from') – P, 046, 94, 1006, 1859, 2042, 2065, 2073, 2138, 2432

Revelation 1:6

βασιλειαν ('kingdom') – א, A, 046, 1854, 2050, 2351
βασιλεις ('kings') – P, Byz^{A}

0 Textual variants in Revelation 2

Revelation 2:1

0 Textual variants in Revelation 3

Revelation 3:1

0 Textual variants in Revelation 4

Revelation 4:1

1 Textual variants in Revelation 5

Revelation 5:9

ἠγόρασας τῷ θεῷ ('redeemed to God') – A, eth
ἠγόρασας τῷ θεῷ ἡμας ('redeemed to God us') – 046, 1006, 1611, 1859, 2020, 2042, 2053, 2065, 2081, 2138, 2432, cop^{bo} א
ἠγόρασας ἡμας τῷ θεῷ ('redeemed us to God') – 94, 1828, 2073, 2344, cop^{sa}
ἠγόρασας ἡμας ('redeemed us') – 2065*, 2814, Cyprian

0 Textual variants in Revelation 6

Revelation 6:1

0 Textual variants in Revelation 7

Revelation 7:1

1 Textual variants in Revelation 8

Revelation 8:13

αετου – א, A, P^{115}, 046, 1424, 1841, 1862, 93, 456, 627, 920, 1611, 2329, 2351, Byz, Philoxenian, Harklean, Vulgate, Old Latin, Boharic, Sahidic, Ethiopic, Georgian, Ansbert, Bede, Oikoumenios, Primasius, Caesarius, Tyconius
αγγελου – P, 2074, 104, 241, 256, 2059, 2081, 620, 922, 2186, 2286, 2814, Byz^{A}, Armenian, Slavonic, Andreas, Victorious
αγγελου ως αετου — 42, Oikoumenios^{comm}

0 Textual variants in Revelation 9

Revelation 9:1

0 Textual variants in Revelation 10

Revelation 10:1

2 Textual variants in Revelation 11

Revelation 11:17

ο ων και ο ην και ο ερχομενος — Boharic, Tyconius, Beatus, 1841, 051, 2074, 35, 1006, 911/2040, 1740, 469, 757
ο ων και ο ην και — P^{47}, Sinaiticus, 0308, C, 2344
ο ων και ο ην — Byz, 2814

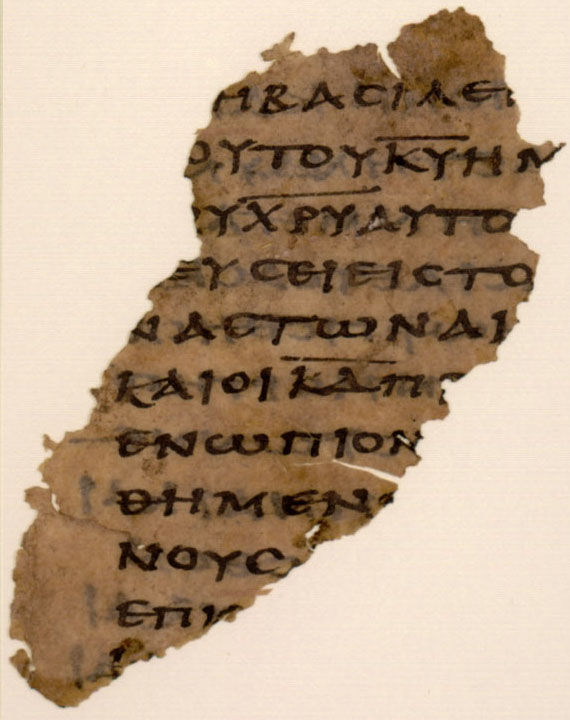
Revelation 11:18 in Uncial 0308, the reading "Servants and prophets"

Revelation 11:18

τοις δουλοις σου και τοις προφηταις ('thy servants and prophets') – 𝔓^{47}, א, 0308
τοις δουλοις σου τοις προφηταις ('thy servants prophets') – A, Byz

0 Textual variants in Revelation 12

Revelation 12:1

1 Textual variants in Revelation 13

Revelation 13:18

εξακοσιοι εξηκοντα εξ ('six hundred sixty-six') – א A P 046, most minuscules, Byz^{pt} lat syr cop arm eth Irenaeus Hippolytus Origen Victorinus Gregory Primasius Andrew Beatus Arethas
χ̅ξ̅ϲ̅ ('666') – 𝔓^{47} 051 Byz^{pt}
εξακοσιοι εξηκοντα πεντε ('six hundred sixty-five') – 2344
εξακοσιοι τεσσαρακοντα εξ ('six hundred forty-six') – it^{ar}
εξακοσιοι δεκα εξ ('six hundred sixteen') – C vg^{ms} Irenaeus^{mss} Tyconius^{pt} Caesarius
χ̅ι̅ϲ̅ ('616') – 𝔓^{115}

0 Textual variants in Revelation 14

Revelation 14:1

0 Textual variants in Revelation 15

Revelation 15:1

0 Textual variants in Revelation 16

Revelation 16:1

0 Textual variants in Revelation 17

Revelation 17:1

1 Textual variants in Revelation 18

Revelation 18:20

αγιοι αποστολοι — C, 051, 2329, 35, 2059, 2081, 2344, 2186, 2286, 2814, Vg^{Cl}, it^{gig}, Byz^{A}
αγιοι και οι αποστολοι — Sinaiticus, A, P, 046, 1424, 1841, 1862, 82, 93, 456, 627, 920, 1611, 2074, 2053, 2062, Byz
αγγελου και οι αποστολοι — Hippolytus, syr^{har}

0 Textual variants in Revelation 19

Revelation 19:1

0 Textual variants in Revelation 20

Revelation 20:1

0 Textual variants in Revelation 21

Revelation 21:1

1 Textual variants in Revelation 22

Revelation 22:14

ποιουντες τας εντολας αυτου ('those who do His commandments') – 046 94 205 209 1611^{supp} 1854 1859 2030 2042 2065 2073 2138 2329 2377 2432 2814 Byz it^{gig} syr cop^{bo} (Tertullian) Cyprian Tyconius (Caesarius) Andrew (Beatus) Arethas
τηρουντες τας εντολας αυτου ('those who keep His commandments') – arm
πλυνοντες τας στολας αυτων ('those who wash their robes') – א A 1006 1841 2020 (2050) 2053 2062 it^{mss} vg cop^{sa} eth Ambrose Apringius Fulgentius (Primasius) Haymo

== See also ==
- Bible version debate
- Biblical inerrancy
- Caesarean text-type
- Categories of New Testament manuscripts
- Comparison of codices Sinaiticus and Vaticanus
- King James Only movement
- List of New Testament verses not included in modern English translations
- Modern English Bible translations
- Textual variants in the Hebrew Bible
- Textual variants in the Primary Chronicle
- The New Testament in the Original Greek
- Western text-type

== Bibliography ==
- Münster Institut für Neutestamentliche Textforschung (2017). Bibelausgaben Novum Testamentum Graecum, Editio Critica Maior / Band III: Die Apostelgeschichte: Gesamtband Teil 1-3. Deutsche Bibelgesellschaft. ISBN 978-3438056146.
- Münster Institut für Neutestamentliche Textforschung (2013). Novum Testamentum Graecum Editio Critica Maior IV, Die Katholischen Briefe, Teil 1 und Teil 2, Gesamtwerk. Deutsche Bibelgesellschaft. ISBN 978-3438056054.
- American Bible Society (2012). Novum Testamentum Graece — Nestle-Aland 28th Revidierte Auflage. Deutsche Bibelgesellschaft. ISBN 978-3438051400.
- American Bible Society (2014). The Greek New Testament — Fifth Revised Edition. Deutsche Bibelgesellschaft. ISBN 978-3438051165.
- Bruce M. Metzger (2005). A Textual Commentary on the Greek New Testament — Second Edition. Hendrickson Publishers, Inc. ISBN 1598561642.
- Kurt Aland (1985). Synopsis Quattuor Evangeliorum: Locis Parallelis Evangeliorum Apocryphorum Et Patrum Adhibitis Edidit. Deutsche Bibelgesellschaft. ISBN 3438051303.
- Brooke Foss Westcott, Fenton John Anthony Hort (1881). The New Testament in the Original Greek. Macmillan & Co.
- Zane C. Hodges, Arthur L. Farstad (1982). The Greek New Testament According to the Majority Text. Thomas Nelson Publishers. ISBN 0840749635.
- David Holly (1983). Comparative Studies in Recent Greek New Testament Texts. Biblical Institute Press. ISBN 8876535810.
- Constantinus Tischendorf (1869). Novum Testamentum Graece, ad antiquissimos testes denuo recensuit apparatum criticum omni studio perfectum apposuit commentationem Isagogicam praetexuit, Editio Octava Critica Maior: Volumen I. Giesecke und Devrient.
- Constantinus Tischendorf (1872). Novum Testamentum Graece, ad antiquissimos testes denuo recensuit apparatum criticum omni studio perfectum apposuit commentationem Isagogicam praetexuit, Editio Octava Critica Maior: Volumen II. Giesecke und Devrient.
- Hermann Freiherr von Soden (1902–1913). Die Schriften des Neuen Testaments in ihrer ältesten erreichbaren Textgestalt hergestellt auf Grund ihrer Textgeschichte. Alexander Duncker; Vandenhoeck und Ruprecht.
- Alexander Souter (1910). Novum Testamentum Graece: Textui a Retractatoribus Anglis Adhibito Brevem Adnotationem Criticam Subiecit. Clarendon Press.
- Karl Lachmann (1842–1850). Testamentum Novum Græce et Latine Carolus Lachmannus recensuit. Philippus Butmannus, Ph. F. Græcæ Lectionis Auctoritatis, apposuit. Berolini.
- S.C.E. Legg (1935). Novum Testamentum Graece secundum textum Westcotto-Hortianum; Evangelium Secundum Marcum, cum apparatu critico nouo plenissimo, lectionibus codicum nuper repertorum additis, editionibus versionum antiquarum et patrum ecclesiasticorum denuo inuestigatis. Clarendon Press.
- S.C.E. Legg (1940). Novum Testamentum Graece secundum textum Westcotto-Hortianum; Evangelium Secundum Mattaeum, cum apparatu critico nouo plenissimo, lectionibus codicum nuper repertorum additis, editionibus versionum antiquarum et patrum ecclesiasticorum denuo inuestigatis. Clarendon Press.
- Augustinus Merk (1933). Novum Testamentum Graece, apparatu critico instructum. Pontifici Instituti Biblici.
- Albert Huck, Heinrich Greeven (1981). Synopse Der Drei Ersten Evangelien: Mit Beigabe Der Johanneischen Parallelstellen. Mohr Siebrek Ek. ISBN 3161430328.
- Reuben Swanson (2005). New Testament Greek Manuscripts: Gospel 4-Pack. Tyndale House Publishers, Inc. ISBN 1414307632.
- Reuben Swanson (1996). New Testament Greek Manuscripts: Acts. Tyndale House Publishers, Inc. ISBN 0865850550.
- Reuben Swanson (2002). New Testament Greek Manuscripts: Romans. Tyndale House Publishers, Inc. ISBN 0865850704.
- Reuben Swanson (2003). New Testament Greek Manuscripts: 1 Corinthians. Tyndale House Publishers, Inc. ISBN 0865850720.
- Reuben Swanson (2006). New Testament Greek Manuscripts: 2 Corinthians. Tyndale House Publishers, Inc. ISBN 0865850739.
- Reuben Swanson (1999). New Testament Greek Manuscripts: Galatians. Tyndale House Publishers, Inc. ISBN 0842339744.
- Samuel Prideaux Tregelles (1857). The Greek New Testament. Samuel Bagster and Sons.
