= Minuscule 81 =

Greek minuscule manuscript of the New Testament

- New Testament manuscript
- Text: Acts, Pauline epistles †
- Date: 1044
- Script: Greek
- Found: Tischendorf in 1853
- Now at: British Library; Alexandria
- Size: 18 cm by 12.6 cm
- Type: Alexandrian text-type
- Category: II

Minuscule 81 (in the Gregory-Aland numbering), or α162 (in the Soden numbering), is a Greek minuscule manuscript of the New Testament, on parchment. It is dated by a colophon to the year 1044. Formerly, it was labelled by Gregory as 61^{a} and 61^{p}. The manuscript is lacunose. It was adapted for liturgical use.

== Description ==
The codex contains almost complete text of the Acts of the Apostles and the Epistles on 282 parchment leaves (18 cm by 12.6 cm), with some lacunae (Acts 4:8-7:17; 17:28-23:9 - 297 verses). The text is written in one column per page, in 23 lines per page, in small letters.

It contains list of the κεφαλαια (list of contents) only for Epistle of James. Lectionary markings were added on the margin by a later hand (for liturgical use).

== History ==
According to the manuscript's colophon, it was written on April 20, 1044 by a scribe named John at the request of another monk named Jakob.

The codex was discovered by Constantin von Tischendorf in Egypt in 1853, who took 57 leaves of the codex (Acts of the Apostles) with him. He sold it to the Trustees of the British Museum in 1854. Now, it is located in the British Library (Add MS 20003) in London. 225 leaves are still in Alexandria, where they are held in the Patriarchat Library (59).

Tischendorf collated and published text of it in 1854 (Anecdota sacra). C. R. Gregory saw it in 1883.

Formerly, it was labelled by Gregory as 61^{a} and 61^{p}. In 1908, Gregory gave it number 81.

== Legend ==
New Testament sigla legend

New Testament sigla legend

This is a guide to the sigla (symbols and abbreviations) most frequently used in citations of source material for a Greek New Testament (NT) manuscript. Editors of a scholarly critical text of the NT use each siglum to shrink the space needed for listing witnesses to a particular reading in the critical apparatus. The intended reader, a Bible translator, scholar, orator, or student, needs to know these abbreviations, e.g. for deciding whether to use alternative readings of the critical text or to understand the origin and attestation of a particular passage.

A manuscript may have a Gregory–Aland index number because it is a Greek minuscule (see list). However, if the number has a leading 0, it is a Greek uncial (see list) using the older majuscule script.

Besides these sigla and annotations, scholars often abbreviate other words and phrases after the manner of A Plain Introduction to the Criticism of the New Testament by Scrivener, which began a formalized system of collation, cataloguing, and jargon for NT textual critics in 1861.

General sigla

General sigla

# beginning with 0: uncial
# not beginning with 0: minuscule
^{*} superscript: original reading
^{app} superscript: the critical apparatus reading
^{c} superscript: scribal correction
^{com} superscript: Biblical commentary reading
^{1,2,3...} superscripts: 1st, 2nd, 3rd... scribal corrections
^{v.l.} superscript: varia lectio, i.e. alternative reading
^{mg} superscript: reading in the margin
^{ms} superscript: individual manuscript
^{mss} superscript: multiple manuscripts
^{pt} superscript: partial attestation
^{s} superscript: reading in a supplement to the text
^{txt} superscript: the reading of the text
^{vid} superscript: apparent but uncertain reading
aeth or eth: Ethiopic versions
al: alii: i.e., others
arab: Arabic versions
arm: Armenian versions
Byz: Byzantine text-type in the Catholic letters and superscript:

pt: a part of the Codices Byzantini

cop: Coptic versions

ac or akh: Akhmimic version
ac^{2}: Subakhmimic or Lycopolitanic version
bo: Boharic version
cv: Dialect V
cw: Dialect W
fa or fay or mf: Fayyumic Version
mae: Middle Egyptian or Mesokemic version
pbo: Proto-Bohartic version
sa: Sahidic version

ƒ: individually-numbered Greek manuscript family - superscripts:

1: Family 1
13: Family 13

geo: Georgian versions
goth: Gothic versions
𝕲: The Greek Old Testament text, i.e. Septuagint (LXX)
𝕳: The Hebrew Old Testament text, i.e. the Masoretic Text
it: Italic/Vetus Latina, lowercase letters for individual Old Latin manuscripts
lat: most Italic and Vulgate
latt: all Italic and Vulgate, Masoretic Text
P or 𝔓: papyrus
𝑙 or ℓ: individually numbered lectionary
Lect: most or all numbered lectionaries
𝔐: Greek Majority text and superscripts:

A: Andreas of Caesarea commentary in Revelation
C: Complutensian tradition
K: the Koine tradition in Revelation

o: omits
parenthesized (): reading or witness with a slight difference
pc: pauci: i.e., few
pm: permulti: i.e., many
rell: all other extant manuscripts
slav: Slavic versions in Old Church Slavonic
syr or sy: Syriac versions and superscripts:

c or cur: Curetonian Gospels
s: Sinaitic Palimpsest
h: Harclean Syriac
hmg: Harclean Syriac, margin
pal: Palestinian Syriac
p: the Peshitta

vg: Latin Vulgate manuscripts (capital letters)

A: Codex Amiatinus
F: Codex Fuldensis
gig: Codex Gigas (Old Latin in Acts and Revelation)
Σ or S: Codex Sangallensis 1395

Major manuscripts

Greek Uncials (siglum or leading 0)

א: Codex Sinaiticus (01)
A: Codex Alexandrinus (02)
B: Codex Vaticanus (03)
C: Codex Ephraemi Rescriptus (04)
D^{ea}: Codex Bezae (05)
D^{p}: Codex Claromontanus (06)
E: Codex Basilensis A. N. III. 12 (07)
E^{a}: Codex Laudianus (08)
F^{e}: Codex Boreelianus (09)
F^{p}: Codex Augiensis (010)
G^{e}: Codex Seidelianus I (011)
G^{p}: Codex Boernerianus (012)
H^{e}: Codex Seidelianus II (013)
H^{a}: Codex Mutinensis (014)
H^{p}: Codex Coislinianus (015)
I: Codex Freerianus (016)
K^{e}: Codex Cyprius (017)
K^{ap}: Codex Mosquensis I (018)
L^{e}: Codex Regius (New Testament) (019)
L^{ap}: Codex Angelicus (020)
M: Codex Campianus (021)
N: Codex Petropolitanus Purpureus (022)
O: Sinope Gospels (023)
P^{e}: Codex Guelferbytanus A (024)
P^{apr}: Codex Porphyrianus (025)
Q: Codex Guelferbytanus B (026)
R: Codex Nitriensis (027)
S: Codex Vaticanus 354 (028)
T: Codex Borgianus (029)
U: Codex Nanianus (030)
V: Codex Mosquensis II (031)
W: Codex Washingtonianus (032)
X: Codex Monacensis (X 033) (033)
Y: Codex Macedoniensis (034)
Z: Codex Dublinensis (035)
Γ: Codex Tischendorfianus IV (036)
Δ: Codex Sangallensis 48 (037)
Θ: Codex Koridethi (038)
Λ: Codex Tischendorfianus III (039)
Ξ: Codex Zacynthius (040)
Π: Codex Petropolitanus (New Testament) (041)
Σ: Codex Purpureus Rossanensis (042)
Φ: Codex Beratinus (043)
Ψ: Codex Athous Lavrensis (044)
Ω: Codex Athous Dionysiou (045)
0189: Uncial 0189
See list of other Uncials

Vetus Latina (Old Latin) Uncials (lower-case letters)

it or OL or 𝕷: with superscripts:

^{a}: Codex Vercellensis
^{b}: Codex Veronensis
^{d}: Codex Bezae (Gospels, Acts, 3 Jn)
^{d}: Codex Claromontanus (Paul)
^{e}: Codex Palatinus
^{f}: Codex Brixianus
ff^{1}: Codex Corbeiensis I
ff^{2}: Codex Corbeiensis II
^{g}: Codex Boernerianus
g^{1}: Codex Sangermanensis I
gig: Codex Gigas (Acts and Revelation)
^{h}: Codex Floriacensis
^{j}: Codex Purpureus Sarzanensis
^{k}: Codex Bobiensis
^{l}: Codex Rehdigeranus
r^{1}: Codex Usserianus Primus
^{s}: Codex Bobiensis
^{z}: Harley MS 1772
Numerical and others: See Beuron numbers

Other manuscripts, sources, and printed texts

Other important manuscripts and sources

Lectionaries: See List
ℓ 185: Lectionary 185
ℓ 249: Lectionary 249
Papyri: See List
𝔓^{45}: Papyrus 45 (P. Chester Beatty I)
𝔓^{66}: Papyrus 66
Greek Miniscules: See List (no leading 0)
33: Minuscule 33
2344: Minuscule 2344
The Diatessaron gospel harmony
vg: Printed Latin Vulgate (lowercase superscripts)
cl: Editio Clementina
s: Editio Sixtina
st: Vulgata Stuttgartiensis 2007
ww: Wordsworth/White Vulgate
Church Fathers are cited when relevant
Ju: Justin Martyr
Or: Origen
Dion: Dionysius of Alexandria
Tert: Tertullian

Printed New Testaments: critical and eclectic texts

Latin and Greek Majority texts
E: Erasmus, Novum Instrumentum omne (1516)
ς: The Textus Receptus (so-called) of Robert Estienne (1550)
Beza's Greek and Latin New Testament (1565 to 1611)
M: John Mill, Novum Testamentum Graecum, etc. (1707)
Bengel, Novum Testamentum Graecum (1734)
Wettstein, Novum Testamentum Graecum, etc. (1751)
Ma: Matthaei, Novum Testamentum Graecum, etc. (1803)
Griesbach, Novum Testamentum Graece, etc. (1809 to 1823)
L: Lloyd, Novum Testamentum Graecum (1828, 1836)
Ln: Lachmann, Novum Testamentum Graece et Latine (Greek and Latin, 1842, 1850)
Scr: Scrivener's Greek New Testaments (1877 to 1894)
𝔚: Wordsworth-White, Nouum Testamentum Domini nostri Jesu Christi latine (Latin, 1889)
vS: von Soden, Die Schriften des neuen Testaments, etc. (1902 to 1910)
Farstad and Hodges, The Greek New Testament According to the Majority Text with Apparatus (1982)
Modern Greek NTs with substantially Alexandrian texts
𝔗 or T8th: Tischendorf, Editio Octava Critica Maior (1864 to 1894)
WH: Westcott and Hort, The New Testament in the Original Greek (1881)
Weiss, Das Neue Testament (1894)
NA: Novum Testamentum Graece, Nestle–Aland, NA28 is latest (1898-)
UBS: United Bible Societies, Greek New Testament, UBS5 is latest (1966-)
ECM: Editio Critica Maior, updates to Tischendorf's 8th edition (1997-) (in progress)

== Textual variants ==
The Greek text of the codex is a representative of the Alexandrian text-type, with some the Byzantine readings. It is one of the most important of all minuscule manuscripts. It was the only minuscule manuscript examined by Constantin von Tischendorf. Aland placed it in "at least Category II".

It has been called "the best minuscule witness to Acts" and "the most important minuscule copy of the Acts". F. H. A. Scrivener stated "its value is shown not so much by the readings in which it stands alone, as by agreement with the oldest uncial copies, where their testimonies coincide".

In Acts 16:10, it reads θεος along with 𝔓^{74}, Sinaiticus, Alexandrinus, Vaticanus, Ephraemi, E, 044, 33, 181, 326, 630, 945, 1739, ar, it^{e, l}, vg, cop^{bo}, geo; other reading κυριος, is supported by D, P, 049, 056, 0142, 88, 104, 330, 436, 451, 614, 629, 1241, 1505, 1877, 2127, 2412, 2492, 2495, Byz, it^{c, d, gig}, syr^{p,h}, cop^{sa}.

It does not contain the text of Acts 28:29.

In Romans 8:1, it reads Ιησου κατα σαρκα περιπατουσιν, for Ιησου (as א, B, D, G, 1739, 1881, it^{d, g}, cop^{sa, bo}, eth). The reading of the manuscript is supported by A, D^{b}, Ψ, 629, 2127, vg. The Byzantine manuscripts read Ιησου μη κατα σαρκα περιπατουσιν αλλα κατα πνευμα.

In Romans 13:9, it has additional phrase ου ψευδομαρτυρησεις, the reading is supported by the manuscripts: א (P) 048 104 365 1506 it^{a b} vg^{cl} (syr^{h}) cop^{bo}.

Romans 16:24 is omitted as in Codex Sinaiticus A B C 5 263 623 1739 1838 1962 2127 it^{z} vg^{ww} cop^{sa,bo} eth^{ro} Origen^{lat}).

In 1 Corinthians 2:1, it reads μαρτυριον along with B D G P Ψ 33 104 181 326 330 451 614 629 630 1241 1739 1877 1881 1962 1984 2127 2492 2495 Byz Lect it vg syr^{h} cop^{sa} arm eth. Other manuscripts read μυστηριον or σωτηριον.

In 1 Corinthians 7:5, it reads τη προσευχη (prayer) along with 𝔓^{11}, 𝔓^{46}, א*, A, B, C, D, F, G, P, Ψ, 6, 33, 104, 181, 629, 630, 1739, 1877, 1881, 1962, it vg, cop, arm, eth. Other manuscripts read τη νηστεια και τη προσευχη (fasting and prayer) or τη προσευχη και νηστεια (prayer and fasting).

In 1 Timothy 3:16, it has textual variant θεός ἐφανερώθη (God manifested) (Sinaiticus^{e}, A^{2}, C^{2}, D^{c}, K, L, P, 044, 81, 104, 181, 326, 330, 436, 451, 614, 629, 630, 1241, 1739, 1877, 1881, 1962, 1984, 1985, 2492, 2495, Byz, Lect), against ὃς ἐφανερώθη (he was manifested) supported by Sinaiticus, Codex Alexandrinus, Ephraemi, Boernerianus, 33, 365, 442, 2127, ℓ 599.

In 2 Timothy 4:10, it reads Γαλλιαν, along with Sinaiticus C 104 326 436; other manuscript read Γαλατιαν (A D F G K L P Ψ 33 88 181 330 451 614 629 630 1241 1739 1877 1881 1962 1984 1985 2127 2492 2495 Byz Lect) or Γαλιλαιαν (cop^{bo}).

In Hebrews 8:11, it reads πλησιον for πολιτην, the reading is supported by Codex Porphyrianus, 104, 436, 629, 630, and 1985.

In 1 John 5:6, it has textual variant δι' ὕδατος καὶ πνεύματος καὶ αἵματος (through water and spirit and blood) together with the manuscripts: Codex Porphyrianus, 88, 442, 630, 915, 2492, arm, eth (Note: For another variants of this verse see: Textual variants in the First Epistle of John.) Bart D. Ehrman identified it as Orthodox corrupt reading.

== See also ==
- List of New Testament minuscules
- Textual criticism
- Biblical manuscript
