= Minuscule 181 =

- New Testament manuscript
- Name: Cod. Francisci Xavier
- Text: New Testament (except Gospels)
- Date: 11th century
- Script: Greek
- Now at: Vatican Library
- Size: 25 cm by 19.1 cm
- Type: mixed/Western/Byzantine
- Category: III/V
- Note: marginalia

Minuscule 181 (in the Gregory-Aland numbering), α 101 (Soden), is a Greek minuscule manuscript of the New Testament, on parchment. Palaeographically it has been assigned to the 10th century.

Formerly it was labelled by 40^{a}, 46^{p}, and 12^{r}. It has marginalia.

== Description ==
The codex contains the text of the Acts of the Apostles, Catholic epistles, and Pauline epistles with only one lacunae (Titus 3:3 – Philemon), on 169 elegant parchment leaves (size 25 cm by 19.1 cm). The Book of Revelation contained in this codex has been re-numbed Gregory-Aland 2919. The text is written in one column per page, in 26-32 lines per page.

The text is divided according to the κεφαλαια (chapters), whose numbers are given at the margin, and their τιτλοι (titles of chapters) at the top of the pages.

It contains Prolegomena, lectionary markings at the margin (for liturgical reading), subscriptions at the end of each book, with numbers of στιχοι, Menologion, and the Euthalian Apparatus. Book of Revelation was added in the 15th century, and has been re-numbered GA-2919.

== Legend ==
New Testament sigla legend

New Testament sigla legend

This is a guide to the sigla (symbols and abbreviations) most frequently used in citations of source material for a Greek New Testament (NT) manuscript. Editors of a scholarly critical text of the NT use each siglum to shrink the space needed for listing witnesses to a particular reading in the critical apparatus. The intended reader, a Bible translator, scholar, orator, or student, needs to know these abbreviations, e.g. for deciding whether to use alternative readings of the critical text or to understand the origin and attestation of a particular passage.

A manuscript may have a Gregory–Aland index number because it is a Greek minuscule (see list). However, if the number has a leading 0, it is a Greek uncial (see list) using the older majuscule script.

Besides these sigla and annotations, scholars often abbreviate other words and phrases after the manner of A Plain Introduction to the Criticism of the New Testament by Scrivener, which began a formalized system of collation, cataloguing, and jargon for NT textual critics in 1861.

General sigla

General sigla

# beginning with 0: uncial
# not beginning with 0: minuscule
^{*} superscript: original reading
^{app} superscript: the critical apparatus reading
^{c} superscript: scribal correction
^{com} superscript: Biblical commentary reading
^{1,2,3...} superscripts: 1st, 2nd, 3rd... scribal corrections
^{v.l.} superscript: varia lectio, i.e. alternative reading
^{mg} superscript: reading in the margin
^{ms} superscript: individual manuscript
^{mss} superscript: multiple manuscripts
^{pt} superscript: partial attestation
^{s} superscript: reading in a supplement to the text
^{txt} superscript: the reading of the text
^{vid} superscript: apparent but uncertain reading
aeth or eth: Ethiopic versions
al: alii: i.e., others
arab: Arabic versions
arm: Armenian versions
Byz: Byzantine text-type in the Catholic letters and superscript:

pt: a part of the Codices Byzantini

cop: Coptic versions

ac or akh: Akhmimic version
ac^{2}: Subakhmimic or Lycopolitanic version
bo: Boharic version
cv: Dialect V
cw: Dialect W
fa or fay or mf: Fayyumic Version
mae: Middle Egyptian or Mesokemic version
pbo: Proto-Bohartic version
sa: Sahidic version

ƒ: individually-numbered Greek manuscript family - superscripts:

1: Family 1
13: Family 13

geo: Georgian versions
goth: Gothic versions
𝕲: The Greek Old Testament text, i.e. Septuagint (LXX)
𝕳: The Hebrew Old Testament text, i.e. the Masoretic Text
it: Italic/Vetus Latina, lowercase letters for individual Old Latin manuscripts
lat: most Italic and Vulgate
latt: all Italic and Vulgate, Masoretic Text
P or 𝔓: papyrus
𝑙 or ℓ: individually numbered lectionary
Lect: most or all numbered lectionaries
𝔐: Greek Majority text and superscripts:

A: Andreas of Caesarea commentary in Revelation
C: Complutensian tradition
K: the Koine tradition in Revelation

o: omits
parenthesized (): reading or witness with a slight difference
pc: pauci: i.e., few
pm: permulti: i.e., many
rell: all other extant manuscripts
slav: Slavic versions in Old Church Slavonic
syr or sy: Syriac versions and superscripts:

c or cur: Curetonian Gospels
s: Sinaitic Palimpsest
h: Harclean Syriac
hmg: Harclean Syriac, margin
pal: Palestinian Syriac
p: the Peshitta

vg: Latin Vulgate manuscripts (capital letters)

A: Codex Amiatinus
F: Codex Fuldensis
gig: Codex Gigas (Old Latin in Acts and Revelation)
Σ or S: Codex Sangallensis 1395

Major manuscripts

Greek Uncials (siglum or leading 0)

א: Codex Sinaiticus (01)
A: Codex Alexandrinus (02)
B: Codex Vaticanus (03)
C: Codex Ephraemi Rescriptus (04)
D^{ea}: Codex Bezae (05)
D^{p}: Codex Claromontanus (06)
E: Codex Basilensis A. N. III. 12 (07)
E^{a}: Codex Laudianus (08)
F^{e}: Codex Boreelianus (09)
F^{p}: Codex Augiensis (010)
G^{e}: Codex Seidelianus I (011)
G^{p}: Codex Boernerianus (012)
H^{e}: Codex Seidelianus II (013)
H^{a}: Codex Mutinensis (014)
H^{p}: Codex Coislinianus (015)
I: Codex Freerianus (016)
K^{e}: Codex Cyprius (017)
K^{ap}: Codex Mosquensis I (018)
L^{e}: Codex Regius (New Testament) (019)
L^{ap}: Codex Angelicus (020)
M: Codex Campianus (021)
N: Codex Petropolitanus Purpureus (022)
O: Sinope Gospels (023)
P^{e}: Codex Guelferbytanus A (024)
P^{apr}: Codex Porphyrianus (025)
Q: Codex Guelferbytanus B (026)
R: Codex Nitriensis (027)
S: Codex Vaticanus 354 (028)
T: Codex Borgianus (029)
U: Codex Nanianus (030)
V: Codex Mosquensis II (031)
W: Codex Washingtonianus (032)
X: Codex Monacensis (X 033) (033)
Y: Codex Macedoniensis (034)
Z: Codex Dublinensis (035)
Γ: Codex Tischendorfianus IV (036)
Δ: Codex Sangallensis 48 (037)
Θ: Codex Koridethi (038)
Λ: Codex Tischendorfianus III (039)
Ξ: Codex Zacynthius (040)
Π: Codex Petropolitanus (New Testament) (041)
Σ: Codex Purpureus Rossanensis (042)
Φ: Codex Beratinus (043)
Ψ: Codex Athous Lavrensis (044)
Ω: Codex Athous Dionysiou (045)
0189: Uncial 0189
See list of other Uncials

Vetus Latina (Old Latin) Uncials (lower-case letters)

it or OL or 𝕷: with superscripts:

^{a}: Codex Vercellensis
^{b}: Codex Veronensis
^{d}: Codex Bezae (Gospels, Acts, 3 Jn)
^{d}: Codex Claromontanus (Paul)
^{e}: Codex Palatinus
^{f}: Codex Brixianus
ff^{1}: Codex Corbeiensis I
ff^{2}: Codex Corbeiensis II
^{g}: Codex Boernerianus
g^{1}: Codex Sangermanensis I
gig: Codex Gigas (Acts and Revelation)
^{h}: Codex Floriacensis
^{j}: Codex Purpureus Sarzanensis
^{k}: Codex Bobiensis
^{l}: Codex Rehdigeranus
r^{1}: Codex Usserianus Primus
^{s}: Codex Bobiensis
^{z}: Harley MS 1772
Numerical and others: See Beuron numbers

Other manuscripts, sources, and printed texts

Other important manuscripts and sources

Lectionaries: See List
ℓ 185: Lectionary 185
ℓ 249: Lectionary 249
Papyri: See List
𝔓^{45}: Papyrus 45 (P. Chester Beatty I)
𝔓^{66}: Papyrus 66
Greek Miniscules: See List (no leading 0)
33: Minuscule 33
2344: Minuscule 2344
The Diatessaron gospel harmony
vg: Printed Latin Vulgate (lowercase superscripts)
cl: Editio Clementina
s: Editio Sixtina
st: Vulgata Stuttgartiensis 2007
ww: Wordsworth/White Vulgate
Church Fathers are cited when relevant
Ju: Justin Martyr
Or: Origen
Dion: Dionysius of Alexandria
Tert: Tertullian

Printed New Testaments: critical and eclectic texts

Latin and Greek Majority texts
E: Erasmus, Novum Instrumentum omne (1516)
ς: The Textus Receptus (so-called) of Robert Estienne (1550)
Beza's Greek and Latin New Testament (1565 to 1611)
M: John Mill, Novum Testamentum Graecum, etc. (1707)
Bengel, Novum Testamentum Graecum (1734)
Wettstein, Novum Testamentum Graecum, etc. (1751)
Ma: Matthaei, Novum Testamentum Graecum, etc. (1803)
Griesbach, Novum Testamentum Graece, etc. (1809 to 1823)
L: Lloyd, Novum Testamentum Graecum (1828, 1836)
Ln: Lachmann, Novum Testamentum Graece et Latine (Greek and Latin, 1842, 1850)
Scr: Scrivener's Greek New Testaments (1877 to 1894)
𝔚: Wordsworth-White, Nouum Testamentum Domini nostri Jesu Christi latine (Latin, 1889)
vS: von Soden, Die Schriften des neuen Testaments, etc. (1902 to 1910)
Farstad and Hodges, The Greek New Testament According to the Majority Text with Apparatus (1982)
Modern Greek NTs with substantially Alexandrian texts
𝔗 or T8th: Tischendorf, Editio Octava Critica Maior (1864 to 1894)
WH: Westcott and Hort, The New Testament in the Original Greek (1881)
Weiss, Das Neue Testament (1894)
NA: Novum Testamentum Graece, Nestle–Aland, NA28 is latest (1898-)
UBS: United Bible Societies, Greek New Testament, UBS5 is latest (1966-)
ECM: Editio Critica Maior, updates to Tischendorf's 8th edition (1997-) (in progress)

== Textual variants ==
The Greek text of the codex is a mixture of text-types in Acts and Catholic epistles. The Text of the Pauline epistles is a representative of the Western text-type. The text of the Apocalypse is a representative of the Byzantine. Aland placed it in Category V. The text of the rest of book Aland placed in Category III.

In Acts 7:18 it reads Εγυπτον for Αιγυπτον.

In Acts 12:25 it reads απο Ιερουσαλημ (from Jerusalem) along with D, Ψ, 436, 614, 2412, ℓ 147, ℓ 809, ℓ 1021, ℓ 1141, ℓ 1364, ℓ 1439, ar, d, gig, vg, Chrysostom; majority reads εις Ιερουσαλημ (to Jerusalem);

In Acts 16:10 it reads θεος along with P^{74}, Sinaiticus, Alexandrinus, Vaticanus, Ephraemi, E, 044, 33, 81, 326, 630, 945, 1739, ar, e, l, vg, cop^{bo}, geo; other reading κυριος, is supported by D, P, 049, 056, 0142, 88, 104, 330, 436, 451, 614, 629, 1241, 1505, 1877, 2127, 2412, 2492, 2495, Byz, c, d, gig, syr^{p,h}, cop^{sa}.

In Acts 18:26 it reads την οδον του θεου along with P^{74}, א, A, B, 33, 88, 326, 436, 614, 2412, ℓ 60, ℓ 1356.

In Romans 8:1 it reads Ιησου κατα σαρκα περιπατουσιν αλλα κατα πνευμα, for Ιησου. The reading of the manuscript is supported by א^{c}, D^{c}, K, P, 33, 88, 104, 326, 330, (436 omit μη), 456, 614, 630, 1241, 1877, 1962, 1984, 1985, 2492, 2495, Byz, Lect.

The text of Romans 16:25-27 is following 14:23, as in Codex Angelicus Codex Athous Lavrensis, Uncial 0209 326 330 451 460 614 1241 1877 1881 1984 1985 2492 2495.

In 1 Corinthians 2:1 it reads μαρτυριον along with B D G P Ψ 33 81 104 326 330 451 614 629 630 1241 1739 1877 1881 1962 1984 2127 2492 2495 Byz Lect it vg syr^{h} cop^{sa} arm eth. Other manuscripts read μυστηριον or σωτηριον.

In 1 Corinthians 7:5 it reads τη προσευχη (prayer) along with 𝔓^{11}, 𝔓^{46}, א*, A, B, C, D, F, G, P, Ψ, 6, 33, 81, 104, 629, 630, 1739, 1877, 1881, 1962, it vg, cop, arm, eth. Other manuscripts read τη νηστεια και τη προσευχη (fasting and prayer) or τη προσευχη και νηστεια (prayer and fasting).

In 1 Timothy 3:16 it has textual variant θεός ἐφανερώθη (God manifested) (Sinaiticus^{e}, A^{2}, C^{2}, D^{c}, K, L, P, Ψ, 81, 104, 326, 330, 436, 451, 614, 629, 630, 1241, 1739, 1877, 1881, 1962, 1984, 1985, 2492, 2495, Byz, Lect), against ὃς ἐφανερώθη (he was manifested) supported by Sinaiticus, Codex Alexandrinus, Ephraemi, Boernerianus, 33, 365, 442, 2127, ℓ 599.

In 2 Timothy 4:19 it has additional reading Λεκτραν την γυναικα αυτου και Σιμαιαν και Ζηνωνα τους υιους αυτου, this reading occurs in several other manuscripts and in Acta Pauli and Tecla.

== History ==
It is dated by the INTF to the 10th century.

The manuscript was given by Christina of Sweden to Cardinal Dezio Azzolino, and bought from him by Alexander VIII (1689-1691) — like codices 154, 155, 156. The text of the manuscript was examined by Bandini, Birch (about 1782), Scholz, and Burgon. C. R. Gregory saw it in 1886.

Formerly it was labelled by 40^{a}, 46^{p}, and 12^{r}. Gregory in 1908 gave it the number 181.

It is currently housed at the Vatican Library (Reg. gr. 179), at Rome.

== See also ==
- List of New Testament minuscules
- Biblical manuscript
- Textual criticism
