= Textual variants in the Third Epistle of John =

Textual variants in the Third Epistle of John are the subject of the study called textual criticism of the New Testament. Textual variants in manuscripts arise when a copyist makes deliberate or inadvertent alterations to a text that is being reproduced. An abbreviated list of textual variants in this particular book is given in this article below.

Most of the variations are not significant and some common alterations include the deletion, rearrangement, repetition, or replacement of one or more words when the copyist's eye returns to a similar word in the wrong location of the original text. If their eye skips to an earlier word, they may create a repetition (error of dittography). If their eye skips to a later word, they may create an omission. They may resort to performing a rearranging of words to retain the overall meaning without compromising the context. In other instances, the copyist may add text from memory from a similar or parallel text in another location. Otherwise, they may also replace some text of the original with an alternative reading. Spellings occasionally change. Synonyms may be substituted. A pronoun may be changed into a proper noun (such as "he said" becoming "Jesus said"). John Mill's 1707 Greek New Testament was estimated to contain some 30,000 variants in its accompanying textual apparatus which was based on "nearly 100 [Greek] manuscripts." Peter J. Gurry puts the number of non-spelling variants among New Testament manuscripts around 500,000, though he acknowledges his estimate is higher than all previous ones.

== Legend ==
A guide to the sigla (symbols and abbreviations) most frequently used in the body of this article.

General sigla
# beginning with 0: uncial
# not beginning with 0: minuscule
^{*} superscript: original reading
^{c} superscript: scribal correction
^{ms} superscript: individual manuscript
^{mss} superscript: multiple manuscripts
^{pt} superscript: partial attestation
^{vid} superscript: uncertain reading
arab: Arabic versions
arm: Armenian versions
𝔐 or Byz: Byzantine text-type
cop: Coptic versions

sa: Sahidic version
bo: Boharic version

eth: Ethiopic versions
ƒ: Greek manuscripts family
geo: Georgian versions
goth: Gothic versions
it: Italic/Vetus Latina
lat: most Italic and Vulgate
latt: all Italic and Vulgate
𝔓: papyrus
𝑙: individually numbered lectionary
Lect: most or all numbered lectionaries
parenthesized (): approximate reading
rell: all other extant manuscripts
slav: Slavic versions
syr: Syriac versions
vg: Latin Vulgate
ς: Textus Receptus

Uncial sigla
א: Codex Sinaiticus (01)
A: Codex Alexandrinus (02)
B: Codex Vaticanus (03)
C: Codex Ephraemi Rescriptus (04)
D^{ea}: Codex Bezae (05)
D^{p}: Codex Claromontanus (06)
K^{e}: Codex Cyprius (017)
K^{ap}: Codex Mosquensis I (018)
L^{e}: Codex Regius (New Testament) (019)
L^{ap}: Codex Angelicus (020)
P^{apr}: Codex Porphyrianus (025)
S: Codex Vaticanus 354 (028)
V: Codex Mosquensis II (031)
W: Codex Washingtonianus (032)
Z: Codex Dublinensis (035)
Γ: Codex Tischendorfianus IV (036)
Δ: Codex Sangallensis 48 (037)
Θ: Codex Koridethi (038)
Ξ: Codex Zacynthius (040)
Π: Codex Petropolitanus (New Testament) (041)
Φ: Codex Beratinus (043)
Ψ: Codex Athous Lavrensis (044)
Ω: Codex Athous Dionysiou (045)
ff^{1}: Codex Corbeiensis I
ff^{2}: Codex Corbeiensis II
g^{1}: Codex Sangermanensis I
k: Codex Bobiensis

Critical editions
T8th: Tischendorf's 8th Edition of Editio Octava Critica Maior
WH: Westcott and Hort (1881)
NA: Novum Testamentum Graece (Nestle–Aland)
UBS: United Bible Societies
ECM: Editio Critica Maior

== Textual variants ==
Textual variants in the Third Epistle of John

24 Textual variants in 3 John

Insciptio

Ιωανου τριτη (Third of John) — א^{c} B^{c}
omit — א* B*
Ιωαννου τριτη επιστολη (Third Epistle of John) — 18
Ιωαννου επιστολη τριτη (Third Epistle of John) — rell

3 John 3

γαρ — A B C K P Ψ 048 049 056 0142 69 88 93 181 326 330 431 436 442 451 614 629 630 945 1243 1505 1739 1845 1846 1877 1881 2412 2492 𝔐 Lect it^{ar} syr cop^{bo^{mss}} Ps-Oecumenius Theophylact
ουν — 1241
omit — א 6 33 81 104 623 2127 2344 2464 2495 lat cop arm eth Cassiodorus

3 John 3

μαρτυρουντων — 𝔐
μαρτυρουν — B

3 John 4

χαραν — 1844^{c}
χαριν — 1844*
εχω χαραν — 614
ουκ εχω χαραν — א A K L P Ψ 048 049 056 0142 33 81 88 104 181 326 330 436 451 629 630 945 1067 1175 1292 1409 1505 1611 1735 1846 1852 1877 2127 2138 2344 2412 2464 2495 𝔐 Lect it^{ar^{mg},p} vg^{mss} syr cop^{sa} arm eth geo slav (Cassiodorus)
χαραν ουκ εχω — C (69) 322 323 1241^{vid} 1739 1881 𝑙^{(422)} 𝑙^{596}
ουκ εχων χαριν — B*
χαριν ουκ εχω — 1243 2298
ουκ εχω χαριν — B^{c} 5 57 1891 2143 2298 2492 it^{ar,c,dem,div,l} vg cop^{bo} Hilary

3 John 4

τη — A B C* 33 81^{vid}
omit — א C^{c} P Ψ 1739 𝔐 cop^{bo}

3 John 5

τουτο — א A B C Ψ 048 33^{vid} 323 1241^{vid} 1739 it^{l} (vg) syr^{h} cop
εις τους — P 𝔐
τους — 81

3 John 7

ονοματος αυτου — Ψ 614 630 1846 2495 vg^{mss} syr
ονοματος — rell

3 John 7

εθνικων — א A B (C) Ψ 33^{vid} 630 1505 1739 1881 it^{l} Jerome
εθνων — P 𝔐 vg

3 John 8

υπολαμβανειν — א A B C* Ψ 33 81 323 1739
απολαμβανειν — C^{c} P 𝔐

3 John 8

τη αληθεια — 𝔐
της αληθειας — 614 623 630 1505 it^{l} vg
τη εκκλησια — א* A

3 John 9

εγραψα τι — א* A 048^{vid} 442 1241 1739 2298 𝑙^{596} it^{(l)} cop^{bo^{mss}} arm (Jerome)
εγραψας τι — B cop^{sa,bo^{mss}}
εγραψα αν — א^{c} 33 81 181 436 614 630 945 1067 1243 1292 1409 1505 1735 1881 2138 2344 2412 2492 𝑙^{422} 𝑙^{1439} lat (syr) Hilary
εγραψα αν τι — 322 323 424^{c} 1611* 𝑙^{1178}
εγραψα αυτη — 326^{c}
εγραψα — C K L P Ψ 049 056 0142 69 88 93 104 326* 330 451 623 629 1175 1611^{c} 1844 1845 1846 1852 1877 2127 2495 𝔐 Lect (eth) geo slav Ps-Oecumenius Theophylact

3 John 10

εκ — A B C 6 33 69 93 623 1845 1852 2344 𝔐
omit — א 048 049 614 630 1243 1505 1739 2492

3 John 10

επιδεχομενους — C 323 1241 1243 1739 1881 2298 vg^{mss}
βουλομενους — rell

3 John 11

κακοποιων — 𝔐
δε κακοποιων — L 1852 vg^{mss} cop

3 John 12

αληθειας (truth) — p74^{(c)} א A^{c} B P Ψ 049 33 1739 𝔐 it vg syr^{h} cop
εκκλησιαις (church) — 𝔓^{74}^{vid} A*^{vid}
εκκλησιαις και της αληθειας (church and truth) – C syr^{ph,h^{mg}}

3 John 12

οιδας — א A B C Ψ 048 33 81 323 614 1241 1739 it^{d} vg syr^{ph} cop
οιδατε — P 𝔐 vg^{ms} syr^{h}
οιδαμεν — 2143 cop^{bo^{ms}}

3 John 13

σοι γραψαι — 048^{vid}
γραψαι σοι — א A B C Ψ 81 323 630 945 1505 1739
γραφειν — P 307 642 1175 2492 (2495) 𝔐

3 John 13

σοι γραφειν — א B C
γραφειν σοι — A Ψ 048 0251^{vid} 33^{vid} 81 323 630 1241 1505 1739
σοι γραψαι — P 𝔐

3 John 14

σε ιδειν — A B C 048^{vid} 5 33 81 323 436 1241 1243 1735 1739
ιδειν σε — א P Ψ 307 442 642 1175 1448 1611 1852 2492 𝔐

3 John 14

λαλησαι σοι — 442 1735
λαλησαι — 81 it^{d} vg^{mss}
λαλησωμεν — 307 1243 vg^{ms}
λαλησομεν — rell

3 John 15

αδελφοι παντες — 1735
αδελφοι — A 33 81 436 642 syr^{ph,h^{mg}}
φιλοι — rell

3 John 15

ασπασαι — א 048^{vid}
ονομα — rell

3 John 15

αδελφους — 436 1448 1611 syr^{h} cop^{bo^{ms}}
φιλους σου — Ψ
φιλους — rell

3 John 15

ονομα αμην — L 307 321 378 467 614 1836 1837 1838 1852 vg^{mss}
ονομα — rell

== See also ==
- Alexandrian text-type
- Biblical inerrancy
- Byzantine text-type
- Caesarean text-type
- Categories of New Testament manuscripts
- Comparison of codices Sinaiticus and Vaticanus
- List of New Testament verses not included in modern English translations
- Textual variants in the New Testament
- Western text-type
