= Textual variants in the Second Epistle of John =

Textual variants in the Second Epistle of John are the subject of the study called textual criticism of the New Testament. Textual variants in manuscripts arise when a copyist makes deliberate or inadvertent alterations to a text that is being reproduced.

Most of the variations are not significant and some common alterations include the deletion, rearrangement, repetition, or replacement of one or more words when the copyist's eye returns to a similar word in the wrong location of the original text. If their eye skips to an earlier word, they may create a repetition (error of dittography). If their eye skips to a later word, they may create an omission. They may resort to performing a rearranging of words to retain the overall meaning without compromising the context. In other instances, the copyist may add text from memory from a similar or parallel text in another location. Otherwise, they may also replace some text of the original with an alternative reading. Spellings occasionally change. Synonyms may be substituted. A pronoun may be changed into a proper noun (such as "he said" becoming "Jesus said"). John Mill's 1707 Greek New Testament was estimated to contain some 30,000 variants in its accompanying textual apparatus which was based on "nearly 100 [Greek] manuscripts." Peter J. Gurry puts the number of non-spelling variants among New Testament manuscripts around 500,000, though he acknowledges his estimate is higher than all previous ones.

== Legend ==
A guide to the sigla (symbols and abbreviations) most frequently used in the body of this article.

General sigla
# beginning with 0: uncial
# not beginning with 0: minuscule
^{*} superscript: original reading
^{c} superscript: scribal correction
^{ms} superscript: individual manuscript
^{mss} superscript: multiple manuscripts
^{pt} superscript: partial attestation
^{vid} superscript: uncertain reading
arab: Arabic versions
arm: Armenian versions
𝔐 or Byz: Byzantine text-type
cop: Coptic versions

sa: Sahidic version
bo: Boharic version

eth: Ethiopic versions
ƒ: Greek manuscripts family
geo: Georgian versions
goth: Gothic versions
it: Italic/Vetus Latina
lat: most Italic and Vulgate
latt: all Italic and Vulgate
𝔓: papyrus
𝑙: individually numbered lectionary
Lect: most or all numbered lectionaries
parenthesized (): approximate reading
rell: all other extant manuscripts
slav: Slavic versions
syr: Syriac versions
vg: Latin Vulgate
ς: Textus Receptus

Uncial sigla
א: Codex Sinaiticus (01)
A: Codex Alexandrinus (02)
B: Codex Vaticanus (03)
C: Codex Ephraemi Rescriptus (04)
D^{ea}: Codex Bezae (05)
D^{p}: Codex Claromontanus (06)
K^{e}: Codex Cyprius (017)
K^{ap}: Codex Mosquensis I (018)
L^{e}: Codex Regius (New Testament) (019)
L^{ap}: Codex Angelicus (020)
P^{apr}: Codex Porphyrianus (025)
S: Codex Vaticanus 354 (028)
V: Codex Mosquensis II (031)
W: Codex Washingtonianus (032)
Z: Codex Dublinensis (035)
Γ: Codex Tischendorfianus IV (036)
Δ: Codex Sangallensis 48 (037)
Θ: Codex Koridethi (038)
Ξ: Codex Zacynthius (040)
Π: Codex Petropolitanus (New Testament) (041)
Φ: Codex Beratinus (043)
Ψ: Codex Athous Lavrensis (044)
Ω: Codex Athous Dionysiou (045)
ff^{1}: Codex Corbeiensis I
ff^{2}: Codex Corbeiensis II
g^{1}: Codex Sangermanensis I
k: Codex Bobiensis

Critical editions
T8th: Tischendorf's 8th Edition of Editio Octava Critica Maior
WH: Westcott and Hort (1881)
NA: Novum Testamentum Graece (Nestle–Aland)
UBS: United Bible Societies
ECM: Editio Critica Maior

== Textual variants ==
Textual variants in the Second Epistle of John

24 Textual variants in 2 John

Insciptio

Ιωανου δευτερα (Second of John) — א^{c} B^{c}
omit — א* B*
Ιωαννου επιστολη δευτερα (Second Epistle of John) — rell

2 John 2

ουσαν — 33 642 2344 cop
ενοικουσαν — A 048 1735
μενουσαν — rell

2 John 3

εσται γαρ μεθ’ ημων — 048
εσται δε μεθ’ ημων — 307
και εσται μεθ’ ημων — 2492
εσται μεθ’ ημων — א B P Ψ 0232 33 323 (614) 1241 1739 𝔐^{pt} vg^{mss} syr^{ph} cop^{sa,bo^{mss}}
εσται μεθ’ υμων — 5 81 945 1735^{c} 𝔐^{pt} it^{l} vg^{mss} cop^{bo^{mss}}
omit — A 630 1448 1505 1852 2464 2495 syr^{h}

2 John 3

παρα — A B Ψ 048 0232 81 88 322 323 326 436 442 629 642 1067 1243 1409 1505 1735 1739 1846 1852 2127 2495 𝑙^{596} lat syr^{ph^{mss}} cop^{sa} eth geo
παρα κυριου — א^{c} K L P 049 056 0142 5 33 181 307 330 451 614 630 945 1175 1448 1844 1877 1881 2298 2344 2412 2464 2492 𝔐 Lect vg^{mss} syr cop arm slav Ps-Oecumenius Theophylact
κυριου — א* 1292 1611 1881 2138 𝑙^{680} 𝑙^{883} 𝑙^{884}
omit — 1505 2495 it^{l} vg^{(mss)} Augustine Cassiodorus

2 John 5

καινην γραφω σοι — Ψ 5 81 642* 1852 it^{l} Augustine^{pt}
καινην γραφων σοι — א A 33 69 323 442 614 630 642^{c} 1241^{c} 1243 1505 1611 1739 2344 2495 vg
γραφων σοι καινην — B P 436 1175 1448 1735 2492 𝔐
γραφω σοι καινην — 623 1241* 2464 Augustine^{pt}

2 John 6

η εντολη εστιν — A B K Ψ 0232 5 33 69 323 630 1241 1505 1611 1735 1739 1852 2344 2495 vg syr
εστιν η εντολη — P 048 307 436 442 642 1175 1243 1448 2492 𝔐 Lucifer
εστιν η εντολη αυτου — א 1846

2 John 7

εξηλθον — p74 א A B Ψ 0232 33 81 323 614 630 1241 1739 2495 vg syr cop^{sa} Irenaeus^{lat}
εισηλθον — P 049 1175 1448 𝔐 cop^{bo}

2 John 8

απολησθε — א*
απολητε — 326*
απολεσητε — א^{c} A B Ψ 0232^{c} 81 88 181 322 323 436 614 630 1067 1241 1409 1505 1611 1735 1739 1846 1852 1881 2138 2298 2344 2412 2464 2492 2495 𝑙^{596} 𝑙^{884} 𝑙^{1439} lat syr cop arm eth geo Irenaeus^{(lat)} Lucifer Isidore Ps-Chrysostom Ps-Oecumenius^{comm} John-Damascus Theophylact^{comm}
απολεσωμεν — K L P 049 056 0142 104 330 451 629 945 1175 1844 1877 2127 𝔐 Lect slav Hilary Ps-Oecumenius Theophylact
απολεσομεν — 𝑙^{603}
απολεσωσιν — 𝑙^{883}
αποληθειτε — 326^{c}
απολεσησθε — 1243

2 John 8

ηργασαμεθα — B* 049*^{vid} 181
ειργασομεθα — 2492
εργασωμεθα — 𝑙^{147} 𝑙^{603}
ειργασαμεθα — B^{c} K L P 049 056 0142 104 330 451 629 945 1175 1448 1844 1877 2127 𝔐 Lect syr^{h^{mg}} cop^{sa^{mss}} geo slav Hilary Ps-Oecumenius Theophylact
ειργασθε — 614 2412
ειργασασθε — א A Ψ 048^{vid} 0232^{vid} 5 33 81 88 307 322 323 326 436 442 630 642 1067 1241 1243 1292 1409 1505 1611 1735 1739 1846 1852^{vid} 1881 2138 2298 2344^{vid} 2464 2495 𝑙^{596} 𝑙^{884} 𝑙^{1439} lat syr cop^{sa^{ms},bo} arm eth Irenaeus^{lat} Lucifer Isidore Ps-Chrysostom Ps-Oecumenius^{comm} John-Damascus Theophylact^{comm}

2 John 8

απολαβετε — 33 1292
απολαβητε — א A B Ψ 0232^{vid} 81 88 181 322 323 326 436 614 630 1067 1241 1243 1409 1505 1611 1735 1739 1846 1852 1881 2138 2298 2344 2412 2464 2492 2495 𝑙^{596} 𝑙^{884} 𝑙^{1439} lat syr cop arm eth geo Irenaeus^{(lat)} Lucifer Isidore Ps-Chrysostom Ps-Oecumenius^{comm} John-Damascus Theophylact^{comm}
απολαβωμεν — K L P 049 056 0142 104 330 451 629 945 1175 1844 1877 2127 𝔐 Lect slav Hilary Ps-Oecumenius Theophylact
απολαβομεν — 𝑙^{603}

2 John 9

προαγων — א A B 048 0232 vg^{mss} cop
παραβαινων — P Ψ 5 33 81 307 436 442 642 1175 1243 1448 1611 1735 1739 1852 2344^{vid} 2492 𝔐 it^{l} vg^{mss} syr Lucifer

2 John 9

διδαχη — א A B Ψ 048 33 81 322 323 442 1241 1243 1739 1846 1852 1881 2344 2464 𝑙^{596} it^{c,l} vg^{mss} syr^{h} cop^{sa,bo^{mss}} arm Didymus Fulgentius
διδαχη αυτου — it^{dem,div,p} vg^{mss} syr^{ph^{mss},h} Lucifer
διδαχη του Χριστου — K L P 056 0142 5 88 104 181 307 326 330 436 451 614 629 630 642 945 1067 1175 1292 1409 1448 1505 1611 1735 1844 1877 2127 2138 2298 2412 2492 2495 𝔐 Lect it^{ar} vg^{mss} syr^{ph^{ms}} cop^{bo^{mss}} eth geo slav Augustine^{vid} Ps-Oecumenius Theophylact
δικαιοσυνη του Χριστου — 𝑙^{422}

2 John 11

insert after πονηροις: ecce praedixi vobis ut in diem domini nostri non confundamini — vg^{mss} (Speculum)
insert after πονηροις: ecce praedixi vobis ut in diem domini nostri Iesu Christi non confundamini — vg^{mss}

2 John 12

αλλα ελπιζω γενεσθαι — א B Ψ 442 614 630 1243 1448 1505 1611 1852 2492 2495 vg^{mss} syr^{h}
ελπιζω γαρ γενεσθαι — A 048^{vid} 5 33 81 323 642 1735 1739 2344 vg^{mss}
αλλα ελπιζω ελθειν — P 307 436 1175 𝔐 it^{l} vg^{mss} syr^{ph} cop^{sa,bo^{ms}}

2 John 12

υμων — A B 0142 5 33 81^{vid} 322 323 436 442 1067 1243 1409 1739 1881 2127 2298 2344* 2464 2492 𝑙^{422} 𝑙^{596} 𝑙^{921} it^{l} vg^{mss} cop^{bo} eth slav
ημων — א K L P Ψ 049 056 88 104 181 307 326 330 451 614 629 630 642 945 1175^{vid} 1292 1448 1505 1611 1735 1844 1846 1852 1877 2138 2412 2495 𝔐 Lect vg^{mss} syr arm geo Ps-Oecumenius Theophylact
εμου — cop^{sa}
omit — 309 327 378

2 John 13

τοις εκλεκτοις — 1067
της εκλεκτης — א A B P Ψ 33 81 88 104 322 323 1243 1409 1735 1739 1846 1881 2127 2298 2344 2464 2492 lat cop geo Bede
της εκλεκτης αμην — K L 049 056 0142 181 326 330 451 614 630 945 1175 1292 1505 1611 1844 1852 1877 2138 2412 2495 𝔐 Lect vg^{mss} slav
της εκκλησιας αμην — 307 vg^{mss}
της εκλεκτης η χαρις μετα σου — 442
της εκλεκτης η χαρις μετα σου αμην — 429 629 1758 1831 𝑙^{596} vg^{mss} arm
της εκλεκτης η χαρις μεθ’ υμων — arm eth^{mss}
της εκλεκτης η χαρις μεθ’ υμων αμην — syr eth^{mss} Ps-Oecumenius Theophylact
electe ecclesia — it^{p}
της εκλεκτης της εν Εφεσω — 465^{mg}
omit — 436

== See also ==
- Alexandrian text-type
- Biblical inerrancy
- Byzantine text-type
- Caesarean text-type
- Categories of New Testament manuscripts
- Comparison of codices Sinaiticus and Vaticanus
- List of New Testament verses not included in modern English translations
- Textual variants in the New Testament
- Western text-type
