= Minuscule 623 =

- New Testament manuscript
- Text: Acts, Catholic epistles, Paul †
- Date: 1037
- Script: Greek
- Now at: Vatican Library
- Size: 34.6 cm by 27.2 cm
- Type: mixed
- Category: III

Minuscule 623 (in the Gregory-Aland numbering), α 173 (von Soden), is a Greek diglot minuscule manuscript of the New Testament, on parchment. It is dated by a colophon to the year 1037. The manuscript is lacunose. Tischendorf labeled it by 156^{a} and 190^{p}.

== Description ==
The codex contains the text of the Acts of the Apostles, Catholic epistles, Pauline epistles on 187 parchment leaves (size 34.6 cm by 27.2 cm) with one lacuna (Acts 1:1-5:4). The text is written in two columns per page, 43-44 lines per page.

The text is divided according to the κεφαλαια (chapters), whose numbers are given at the margin, and the τιτλοι (titles of chapters) at the top of the pages.

It contains Prolegomena, tables of the κεφαλαια (tables of contents) before each book, lectionary markings (for liturgical use), subscriptions at the end of each book, στιχοι, and Euthalian Apparatus. The Pauline epistles have a commentary.

The order of books: Book of Acts, Catholic epistles, and Pauline epistles. On the list of the Pauline epistles, the Hebrews is placed before First Epistle to Timothy.

== Text ==
The Greek text of the codex Aland placed it in Category III.

Ending of the Epistle to the Romans has omitted verse 16:24 (as in codices Codex Sinaiticus A B C 5 81 263 1739 1838 1962 2127 it^{z} vg^{ww} cop^{sa,bo} eth^{ro} Origen^{lat}).

In 1 Corinthians 3:3 it reads ἔρις διχοστασία for ἔρις καί διχοστασίαι (p^{46}, D, 33, 88, 104, 181, 326, 330, 436, 451, 614, 629, 1241). Other manuscripts have reading ἔρις (𝔓^{11}, א, B, C, P, Ψ, 81, 181, 630, 1739, 1877, 1881, it, vg).

== History ==
The manuscript was written in the city Reggio for the wish of Nicolas Archbishop of Calabria by the cleric Theodore from Sicily. Formerly it was held in Grottaferrata.

The manuscript was examined by Zacagni, Johann Jakob Wettstein, Johann Jakob Griesbach, and Johann Martin Augustin Scholz. It was added to the list of New Testament manuscripts by Scholz. C. R. Gregory saw the manuscript in 1886.

Formerly, it was labeled by 156^{a} and 190^{p}. In 1908 Gregory gave the number 623 to it.

The manuscript is currently housed at the Vatican Library (Vat. gr. 1650), at Rome.

== See also ==
- List of New Testament minuscules
- Biblical manuscript
- Textual criticism
