= Uncial 0209 =

- New Testament manuscript
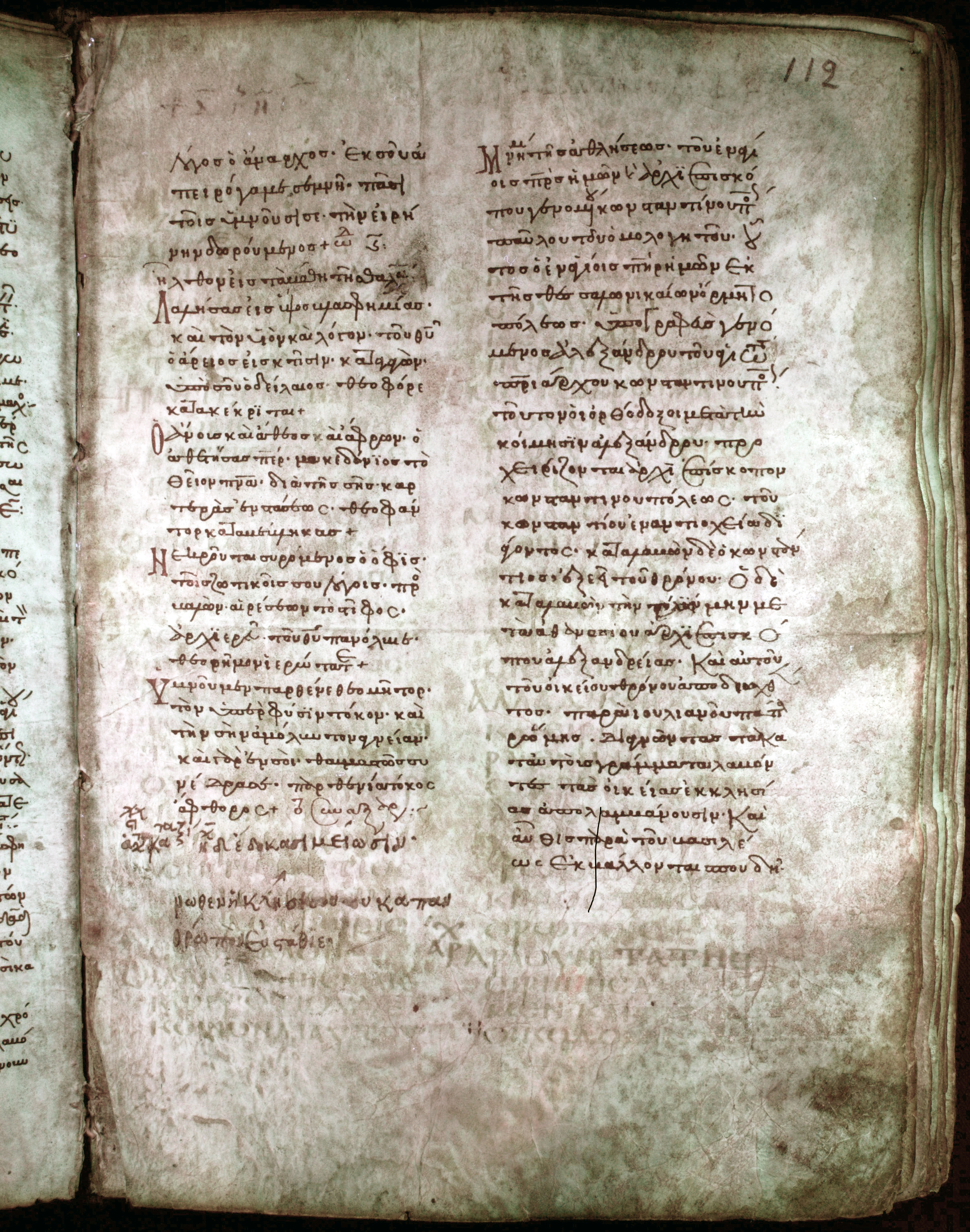
- Folio 112 recto
- Text: Romans 14-16; 2 Corinthians 2:4-7,12-17; 2 Peter
- Date: 7th-century
- Script: Greek
- Now at: University of Michigan Library
- Size: 27 x 19 cm
- Type: mixed
- Category: III

Uncial 0209 (in the Gregory-Aland numbering), is a Greek uncial manuscript of the New Testament, dated palaeographically to the 7th-century.

== Description ==
The codex contains a small parts of the Romans 14:9-23; 16:25-27; 15:1-2; 2 Corinthians 1:1-15; 4:4-13; 6:11-7:2; 9:2-10:17; 2 Peter 1:1-2:3, on 8 parchment leaves (27 cm by 19 cm).

The text is written in two columns per page, 29-32 lines per page, in uncial letters. It is a palimpsest, the upper text contains liturgical in Greek written by minuscule hand, it belongs to Lectionary 1611.

The text-type of this codex is mixed with a strong Byzantine element. Aland placed it in Category III.

The text of Romans 16:25-27 is following after Romans 14:23, as in Codex Angelicus, Codex Athous Lavrensis, Minuscule 181, 326, 330, 451, 460, 614, 1241, 1877, 1881, 1984, 1985, 2492, 2495.

In 2 Corinthians 1:10 it reads τηλικουτου θανατου, along with א, A, B, C, D^{gr}, G^{gr}, K, P, Ψ, 0121a, 0150, 0243, 33, 81, 88, 104, 181, 326, 330, 436, 451, 614, 1241, 1739, 1877, 1881, 1962, 1984, 1985, 2127, 2492, 2495, Byz.

Currently it is dated by the INTF to the 7th century.

The manuscript was added to the list of the New Testament manuscripts by Kurt Aland in 1953.

The codex is currently housed at the University of Michigan Library (Ms. 8, ff. 96, 106–112) in Ann Arbor.

== See also ==
- List of New Testament uncials
- Textual criticism
