= Minuscule 456 =

- New Testament manuscript
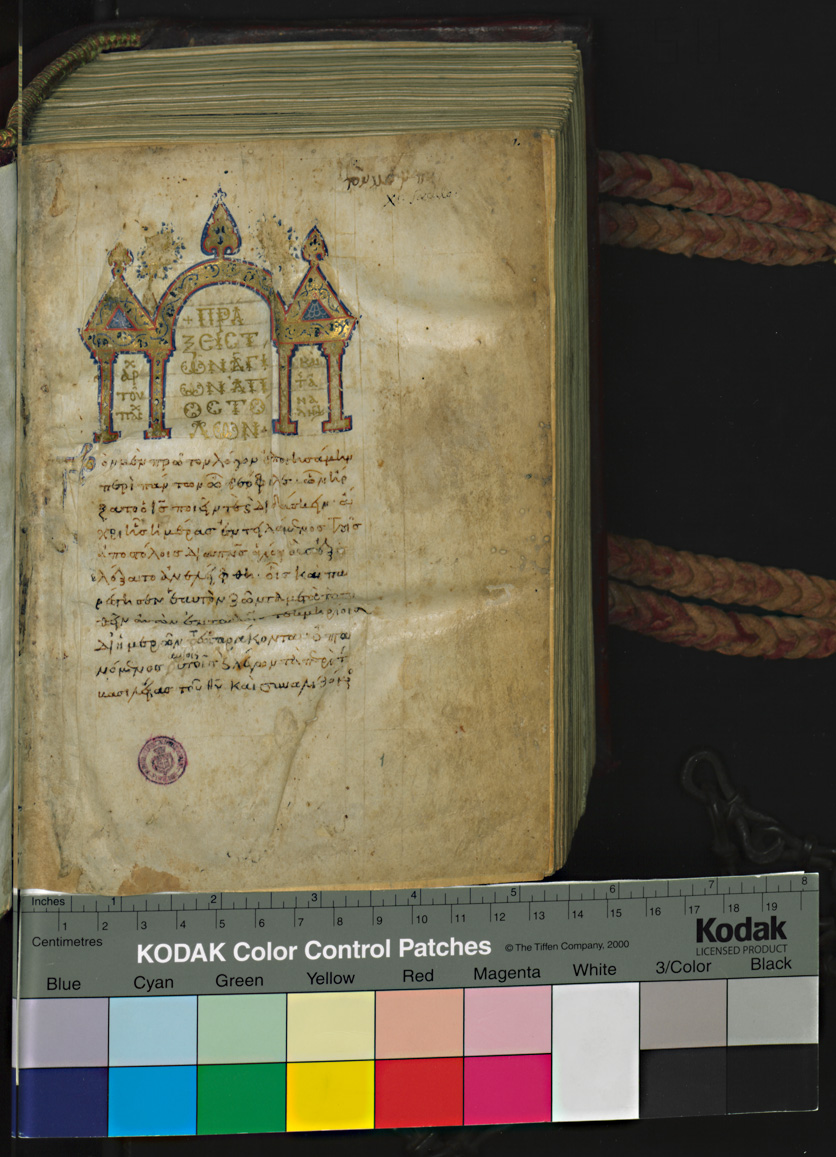
- Folio 1 recto
- Text: New Testament (except Gospels)
- Date: 10th century
- Script: Greek
- Now at: Laurentian Library
- Size: 19 cm by 14.1 cm
- Category: none
- Note: marginalia

Minuscule 456 (in the Gregory-Aland numbering), α 52 (in the Soden numbering), is a Greek minuscule manuscript of the New Testament, on parchment. Palaeographically it has been assigned to the 10th century. Formerly it was labelled by 86^{a}, 96^{p}, and 75^{r}. Marginalia are incomplete. The manuscript was prepared for liturgical use.

== Description ==
The codex contains the text of the Acts of the Apostles, Catholic epistles, Pauline epistles, and Book of Revelation on 244 parchment leaves (19 cm by 14.1 cm). The last leaf of the Book of Revelation was added in the 16th century.

The text is written in two columns per page, in 32 lines per page. The text is divided according to the κεφαλαια (chapters), whose numbers are given at the margin.

It contains Prolegomena, tables of the κεφαλαια (tables of contents) before each sacred book, lectionary markings at the margin (for liturgical use), subscriptions at the end of each book, and numbers of στιχοι.

The order of books: Acts, Catholic epistles, Pauline epistles (Philemon placed before Hebrews), and Book of Revelation.

== Text ==
Kurt Aland the Greek text of the codex did not place in any Category.

In Romans 8:1 it reads Ιησου κατα σαρκα περιπατουσιν αλλα κατα πνευμα, for Ιησου. The reading of the manuscript is supported by א^{c}, D^{c}, K, P, 33, 88, 104, 181, 326, 330, (436 omit μη), 614, 630, 1241, 1877, 1962, 1984, 1985, 2492, 2495, Byz, Lect.

== History ==
The manuscript was examined and slightly collated by Birch and Scholz. Antonio Maria Biscioni published its facsimile in 1752. Hoskier collated text of the Apocalypse.

Formerly it was labelled by 86^{a}, 96^{p}, and 75^{r}. C. R. Gregory saw it in 1886. In 1908 Gregory gave the number 456 to it.

It is currently housed at the Laurentian Library (Plutei IV. 30) in Florence.

== See also ==
- List of New Testament minuscules
- Biblical manuscript
- Textual criticism
