= Minuscule 5 =

Greek minuscule manuscript of the New Testament

- New Testament manuscript
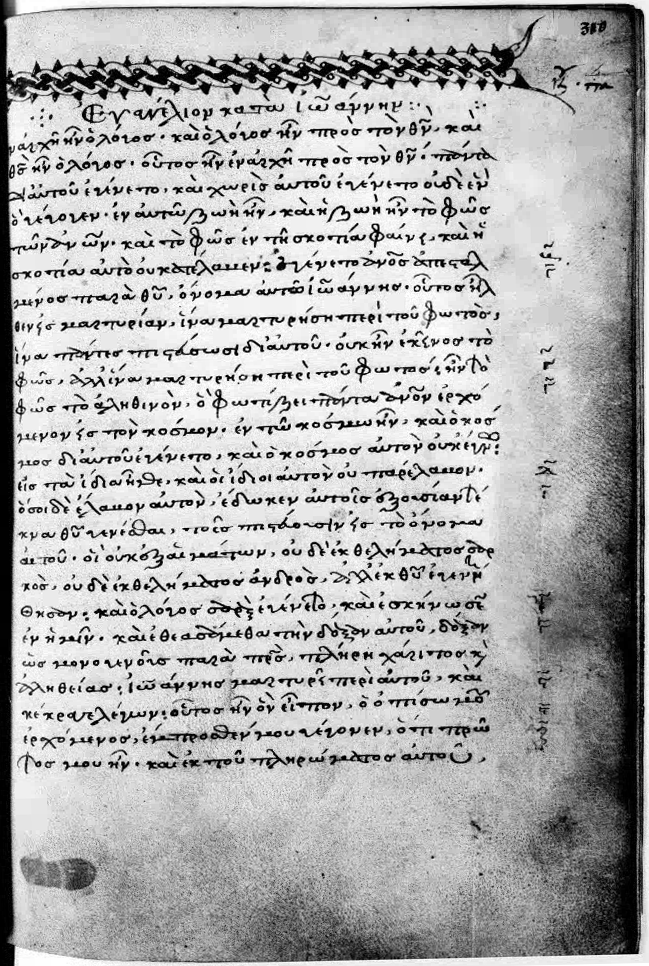
- Text: New Testament (except Rev)
- Date: 13th century
- Script: Greek
- Now at: National Library of France
- Size: 21 cm by 15.5 cm
- Type: mixed, Byzantine
- Category: III/V
- Hand: carefully written
- Note: marginalia

Minuscule 5 is a Greek minuscule manuscript of the New Testament, written on vellum. It is designated by the siglum 5 in the Gregory-Aland numbering of New Testament manuscripts, and δ 453 in the von Soden numbering of New Testament manuscripts. Using the study of comparative writing styles (palaeography), it has been dated to the 13th century.

== Description ==
The manuscript is a codex (precursor to the modern book format), containing the entire New Testament except the Book of Revelation written on 342 parchment leaves (sized 21 cm by 15.5 cm). The order of books is as follows: Acts, Catholic epistles, Pauline epistles and Gospels. Within the Pauline epistles, Hebrews is placed before 1 Timothy, and Colossians precedes Philippians. The text is written in one column per page, 28 lines per page. It has marginalia.

The text is divided according to chapters (known as κεφαλαια / kephalaia), whose numbers are given at the margin, and the titles of chapters (τιτλοι / titloi) at the top of the pages. There is also a division according to the Ammonian Sections (an early division of the Gospels into sections). In Mark there are 234 Sections, the last at Mark 16:9, with references to the Eusebian Canons (another early division of the Gospels into sections, and where they overlap), written below the Ammonian Section numbers.

It contains tables of contents (also known as κεφαλαια kephalaia) before each book, and the Euthalian Apparatus (a division of the rest of the books into sections, similar to the Ammonian sections, along with lists and summaries). According to biblical scholar Frederick H. A. Scrivener, it is a carefully written manuscript.

== Text ==
The Greek text of the codex is considered a representative of the Byzantine text-type. The text-types are groups of different New Testament manuscripts which share specific or generally related readings, which then differ from each other group, and thus the conflicting readings can separate out the groups. These are then used to determine the original text as published; there are three main groups with names: Alexandrian, Western, and Byzantine. Hermann von Soden classified it to the commentated Byzantine text.

The Greek text of the Catholic epistles and Pauline epistles were placed by textual critic Kurt Aland in Category III of his New Testament manuscript text classification system; the Greek text of Acts he placed in Category V; and the Greek text of the Gospels he placed in Category V, but with some hesitation. Category III manuscripts are described as having "a small but not a negligible proportion of early readings, with a considerable encroachment of [Byzantine] readings, and significant readings from other sources as yet unidentified"; and Category V is for "Manuscripts with a purely or predominantly Byzantine text."

According to the Claremont Profile Method (a specific analysis method of textual data), it has mixed text in Luke 1, mixed Byzantine text in Luke 10, and belongs to the textual group 1519 in Luke 20.

In Romans 12:11 it reads καιρω (the season) for κυριω (the Lord), a reading supported by the manuscripts Codex Claromontanus (D^{p})*, Codex Augiensis (F^{p}), Codex Boernerianus (G^{p}), it^{d, g}, and Origen^{lat}.

The ending of the Epistle to the Romans has verse 16:24 omitted, as also seen in codices Codex Sinaiticus (א), Codex Alexandrinus (A), Codex Vaticanus (B), Codex Ephraemi Rescriptus (C), Minuscule 81, 263, 623, 1739, 1838, 1962, it^{z}, vg^{ww}, sa, bo, eth^{ro}, and Origen^{lat}.

== History ==
It was probably written originally in Calabria. It was used by Robert Estienne in his Editio Regia (a critical edition of the Greek New Testament), and designated by him as δ'. It was examined by biblical scholars Johann Jakob Wettstein, Johann Martin Augustin Scholz, and Paulin Martin. Biblical scholar Caspar René Gregory saw the manuscript in 1884.

It was not cited in the modern critical Greek New Testaments NA26 and NA27, but it was used by NA28. The codex is currently located at the National Library of France (Gr. 106) in Paris.

== See also ==
- List of New Testament minuscules
- Textus Receptus
- Textual criticism
