= Codex Angelicus =

Uncial 020
- New Testament manuscript
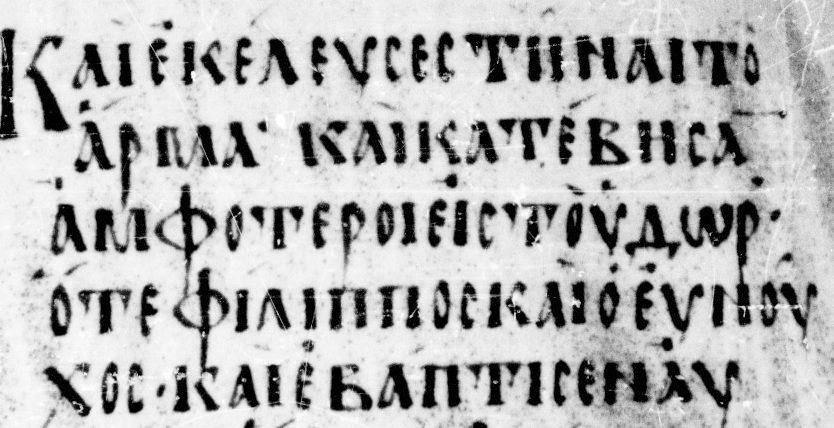
- Fragment with Acts 8:38
- Name: Angelicus
- Sign: L^{ap}
- Text: Acts, CE, Paul
- Date: 9th century
- Script: Greek
- Now at: Biblioteca Angelica
- Size: 27 cm by 21.5 cm
- Type: Byzantine text-type
- Category: V

Codex Angelicus designated by L^{ap} or 020 (in the Gregory-Aland numbering), α 5 (von Soden), is a Greek uncial manuscript of the New Testament. Palaeographically it has been assigned to the 9th century. Formerly it was known as Codex Passionei.

== Description ==
The codex contains text of the Acts of the Apostles, the Catholic epistles, and the Pauline epistles, on 189 parchment leaves (27 cm by 21.5 cm). The text is written in two columns per page, 26 lines per column (size of column 21.2 cm by 7.2 cm). The codex contains large lacunae in Acts 1:1-8:10; and in Hebrews 13:10-25.

It contains prolegomena, lectionary markings at the margin (for liturgical use), subscriptions at the end of each book, and στιχοι.

== Text ==
The Greek text of this codex is a representative of the Byzantine text-type with a few non-Byzantine readings. It is one of the very earliest purely Byzantine manuscripts, and belongs to the textual family Family E. Aland placed it in Category V.

The text of Romans 16:25-27 is following 14:23, as in Codex Athous Lavrensis, Uncial 0209, Minuscule 181 326 330 451 460 614 1241 1877 1881 1984 1985 2492 2495.

In 1 Timothy 3:16 it has textual variant θεός ἐφανερώθη (God manifested) (Sinaiticus^{e}, A^{2}, C^{2}, D^{c}, K, L, P, Ψ, 81, 104, 181, 326, 330, 436, 451, 614, 629, 630, 1241, 1739, 1877, 1881, 1962, 1984, 1985, 2492, 2495, Byz, Lect), against ὃς ἐφανερώθη (he was manifested) supported by Sinaiticus, Codex Alexandrinus, Ephraemi, Boernerianus, 33, 365, 442, 2127, ℓ 599.

In 1 Peter 4:14, the manuscript contains the variant reading κατὰ μὲν αὐτοὺς βλασφημεῖται, κατὰ δὲ ὑμᾶς δοξάζεται ("according to them he is blasphemed, but according to you he is glorified") along with manuscripts K P Ψ 1448 1611, the Byzantine Codices, a majority or all of the Old Latin witnesses, the Wordsworth/White Vulgate Edition, the Greek-manuscript-consulted Harklensis Syriac Vorlage, Sahidic manuscripts, one Bohairic manuscript, and the church father Cyprian (3rd Century).

== History ==
It once belonged to Cardinal Passionei. The manuscript was examined by Montfaucon, Bianchini, Birch (James and 1 Corinthians), Scholz (entire codex), and Ferdinand Fleck in 1833. It was collated by Tischendorf in 1843, and then Tregelles in 1846. It was examined by G. Mucchio.

Wettstein and Scholz designated it by the siglum G. Tischendorf initially employed the same siglum, but in the 7th edition of his Novum Testamentum, he changed this to the siglum L. Gregory assigned it the number 020.

The name of the codex comes from the Biblioteca Angelica library in Rome, where it is now located (shelf number Gr. No. 039).

== See also ==
- List of New Testament uncials
- Textual criticism
