= Uncial 049 =

- New Testament manuscript
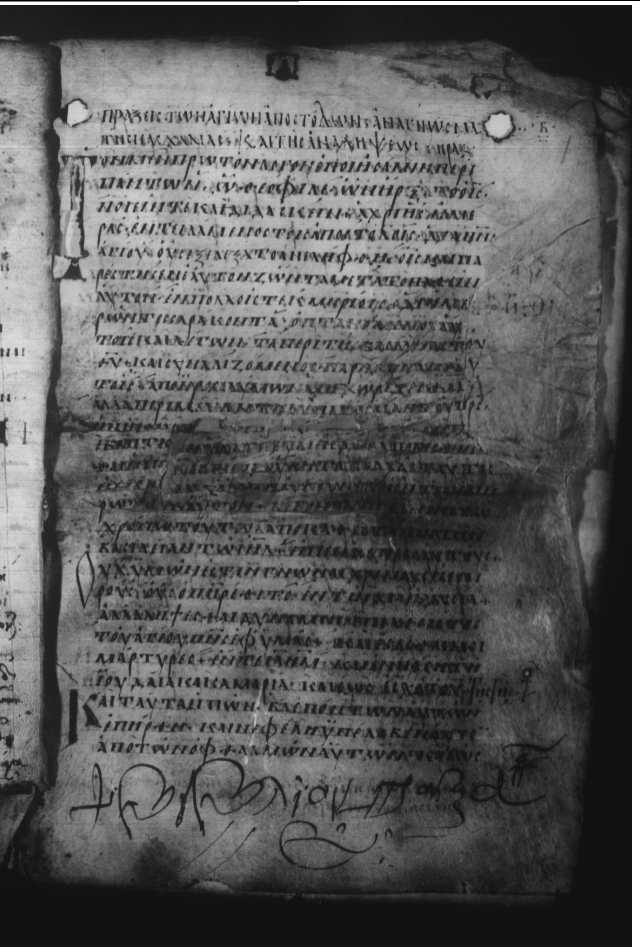
- Text: Acts, GE, Paul
- Date: 9th century
- Script: Greek
- Now at: Great Lavra
- Size: 27.5 cm by 18.5 cm
- Type: Byzantine text-type
- Category: V

Uncial 049 (in the Gregory-Aland numbering), α 2 (von Soden). It is a Greek uncial manuscript of the New Testament. Paleographically it has been assigned to the 9th century.

== Description ==
The codex contains the text of the Acts of Apostles, General epistles, and Pauline epistles, with numerous lacunae in Pauline epistles (it contains only Romans; 1 Cor 1:1-5:8; 13:8-16:24; 2 Cor 1:1-11:23; Eph 4:20-6:20), on 149 parchment leaves (27.5 cm by 18.5 cm). Scrivener designated it by siglum S.

The text is written in one column per page, 30 lines per page (19 x 12.5 cm). The uncial letters are large, partially are upright, partially are leaned to the right. It has breathing and accents. Parchment is not good, ink is brown.

The text is divided according to the κεφαλαια (chapters), whose numbers are given at the margin, with their τιτλοι at the top of the pages.

It contains Prolegomena, the tables of the κεφαλαια (tables of contents) before each book, subscriptions at the end of each book, and στιχοι.

== Text ==
The Greek text of this codex is a representative of the Byzantine text-type. In the Pauline epistles it never supports the original text against the Byzantine. Aland placed it in Category V.

In Acts 2:47 it reads ο δε κυριος προσετιθει τους σωζομενους καθ' ημεραν τη εκκλησια (and the Lord added daily those who were being saved to the church).

In Acts 7:47 it reads οικω for θεω, along with Papyrus 74, Codex Sinaiticus, Codex Vaticanus, Codex Bezae, and some Sahidic manuscripts.

Acts 8:37 is omitted.

In Acts 18:26 it reads την του θεου οδον along with P, Ψ, 0142, 104, 330, 451, 1241, 1877, 2127, 2492, Byz, Lect;

In Acts 26:28 it reads γενεσθαι for ποιησαι along with manuscripts E P 044 056 0142 88 104 326 330 436 451 629 630 945 1241 1505 1739 1877 2127 2412 2492 2495 Byz, Codex Gigas.

In Acts 27:39 it reads εξεωσαι for εξωσαι.

== History ==
C. R. Gregory saw the manuscript in 1886.

The codex is located, in Athos, in the monastery (Great Lavra A' 88).

== See also ==
- List of New Testament uncials
- Biblical manuscript
- Textual criticism
