= Codex Ephraemi Rescriptus =

5th-century handwritten Bible copy in Greek

Uncial 04
- New Testament manuscript
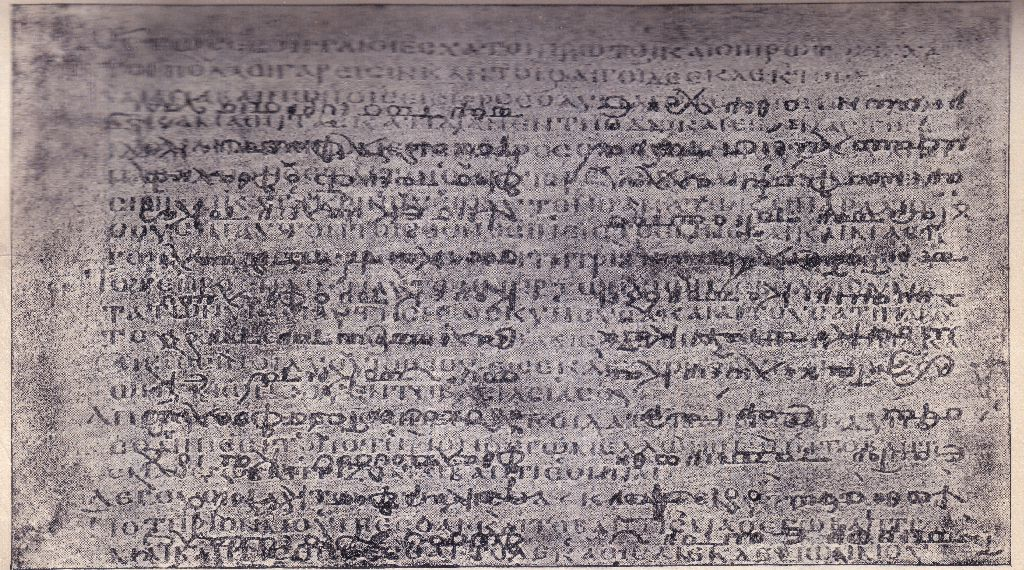
- Codex Ephraemi Rescriptus, at the Bibliothèque Nationale, Paris, Département des manuscrits, Grec 9, fol. 60r (rotated)
- Name: Ephraemi rescriptus
- Sign: C
- Text: Old and New Testament
- Date: c. 425-450
- Script: Greek
- Now at: Bibliothèque nationale de France
- Size: 33 × 27 cm (13.0 × 10.6 in)
- Type: mixture types of text
- Category: II

The Codex Ephraemi Rescriptus is a manuscript of the Greek Bible, written on parchment. It is designated by the siglum C or 04 in the Gregory-Aland numbering of New Testament manuscripts, and δ 3 in the von Soden numbering of New Testament manuscripts. It contains most of the New Testament and some Old Testament books, with sizeable portions missing. It is one of the four great uncials (these being manuscripts which originally contained the whole of both the Old and New Testaments). The manuscript is not intact: its current condition contains material from every New Testament book except 2 Thessalonians and 2 John; however, only six books of the Greek Old Testament are represented. It is not known whether 2 Thessalonians and 2 John were excluded on purpose, or whether no fragment of either epistle happened to survive.

The manuscript is a palimpsest, with the pages being washed of their original text, and reused in the 12th century for the Greek translations of 38 treatises composed by Ephrem the Syrian, from whence it gets its name Ephraemi Rescriptus. The lower text of the palimpsest was deciphered by biblical scholar and palaeographer Constantin von Tischendorf in 1840–1843, and was edited by him in 1843–1845.

== Description ==
The manuscript is a codex (the forerunner to the modern book format), written on parchment, sized 12¼ x 9 in (31.4-32.5 x 25.6-26.4 cm). It has 209 leaves extant, of which 145 belong to the New Testament and 64 to the Old Testament. The letters are medium-sized uncials, in a single column per page, 40–46 lines per page. The text is written continuously, with no division of words (known as Scriptio continua), with the punctuation consisting of only a single point, as in codices Alexandrinus and Vaticanus. The beginning sections have larger letters which stand out in the margin (similar to those in codices Codex Alexandrinus and Codex Basilensis). Iota (ι) and upsilon (υ) have a small straight line over them, which serves as a form of diaeresis. The breathings (utilised to designate vowel emphasis) and accents (used to indicate voiced pitch changes) were added by a later hand. The nomina sacra (special names/words considered sacred in Christianity - usually the first and last letters of the name/word in question are written, followed by an overline; sometimes other letters from within the word are used as well) tend to be contracted into three-letter forms rather than the more common two-letter forms.

A list of chapters (known as κεφαλαια / kephalaia) is preserved before the Gospel of Luke and the Gospel of John. One may deduce from this that the manuscript originally contained chapter lists for the Gospel of Matthew and Gospel of Mark too. The chapter titles (known as τιτλοι / titloi) were apparently not placed in the upper margin of the page; however it is possible the upper margins once contained the titles in red ink, which has since completely faded away; another possibility is the upper portions of the pages have been over-trimmed. The text of the Gospels is accompanied by marginal notations indicating the Eusebian canons (an early system of dividing the four Gospels into different sections, developed by early Christian writer Eusebius of Caesarea), albeit the numerals for the Eusebian Canons were likely written in red ink, which unfortunately have completely vanished. There are no systematic divisions in the other books.

The Pericope Adulterae (John 7:53–8:11) was likely missing from the original codex. The two leaves which contain John 7:3–8:34 are not extant, however by counting the lines and calculating how much space would be required to include John 7:53-8:11 (presuming there’s no other large omission), it can be demonstrated they did not contain sufficient space to include the passage. The text of Mark 16:9–20 is included on folio 148r.

It is difficult to determine whether Luke 22:43–44 (Christ's agony at Gethsemane) was in the original codex; unfortunately the leaves containing the surrounding verses are not extant. Mark 15:28 is not included.

Missing Chapters/Verses

- Gospel of Matthew: 1:1–2; 5:15–7:5; 17:26–18:28; 22:21–23:17; 24:10–45; 25:30–26:22; 27:11–46; 28:15-fin.;
- Gospel of Mark: 1:1–17; 6:32–8:5; 12:30–13:19;
- Gospel of Luke: 1:1–2; 2:5–42; 3:21–4:25; 6:4–36; 7:17–8:28; 12:4–19:42; 20:28–21:20; 22:19–23:25; 24:7–45
- Gospel of John: 1:1–3; 1:41–3:33; 5:17–6:38; 7:3–8:34; 9:11–11:7; 11:47–13:7; 14:8–16:21; 18:36–20:25;
- Acts of the Apostles: 1:1–2; 4:3–5:34; 6:8; 10:43–13:1; 16:37–20:10; 21:31–22:20; 23:18–24:15; 26:19–27:16; 28:5-fin.;
- Epistle to the Romans: 1:1–3; 2:5–3:21; 9:6–10:15; 11:31–13:10;
- First Epistle to the Corinthians: 1:1–2; 7:18–9:6; 13:8–15:40;
- Second Epistle to the Corinthians: 1:1–2; 10:8-fin.
- Epistle to the Galatians: 1:1–20
- Epistle to the Ephesians: 1:1–2:18; 4:17-fin.
- Epistle to the Philippians: 1:1–22; 3:5-fin.
- Epistle to the Colossians: 1:1–2;
- First Epistle to the Thessalonians: 1:1; 2:9-fin.;
- Second Epistle to the Thessalonians entirely
- First Epistle to Timothy: 1:1–3:9; 5:20-fin.;
- Second Epistle to Timothy: 1:1–2;
- Epistle to Titus: 1:1–2
- Epistle to Philemon: 1–2
- Epistle to the Hebrews: 1:1–2:4; 7:26–9:15; 10:24–12:15;
- Epistle of James: 1:1–2; 4:2-fin.
- First Epistle of Peter: 1:1–2; 4:5-fin.;
- Second Epistle of Peter: 1:1;
- First Epistle of John: 1:1–2; 4:3-fin.
- Second Epistle of John entirely;
- Third Epistle of John: 1–2;
- Epistle of Jude: 1–2;
- Book of Revelation: 1:1–2; 3:20–5:14; 7:14–17; 8:5–9:16; 10:10–11:3; 16:13–18:2; 19:5-fin.

In the Old Testament, parts of the Book of Job, the Proverbs, Ecclesiastes, Song of Songs, Wisdom, and Sirach survive.

== Text ==
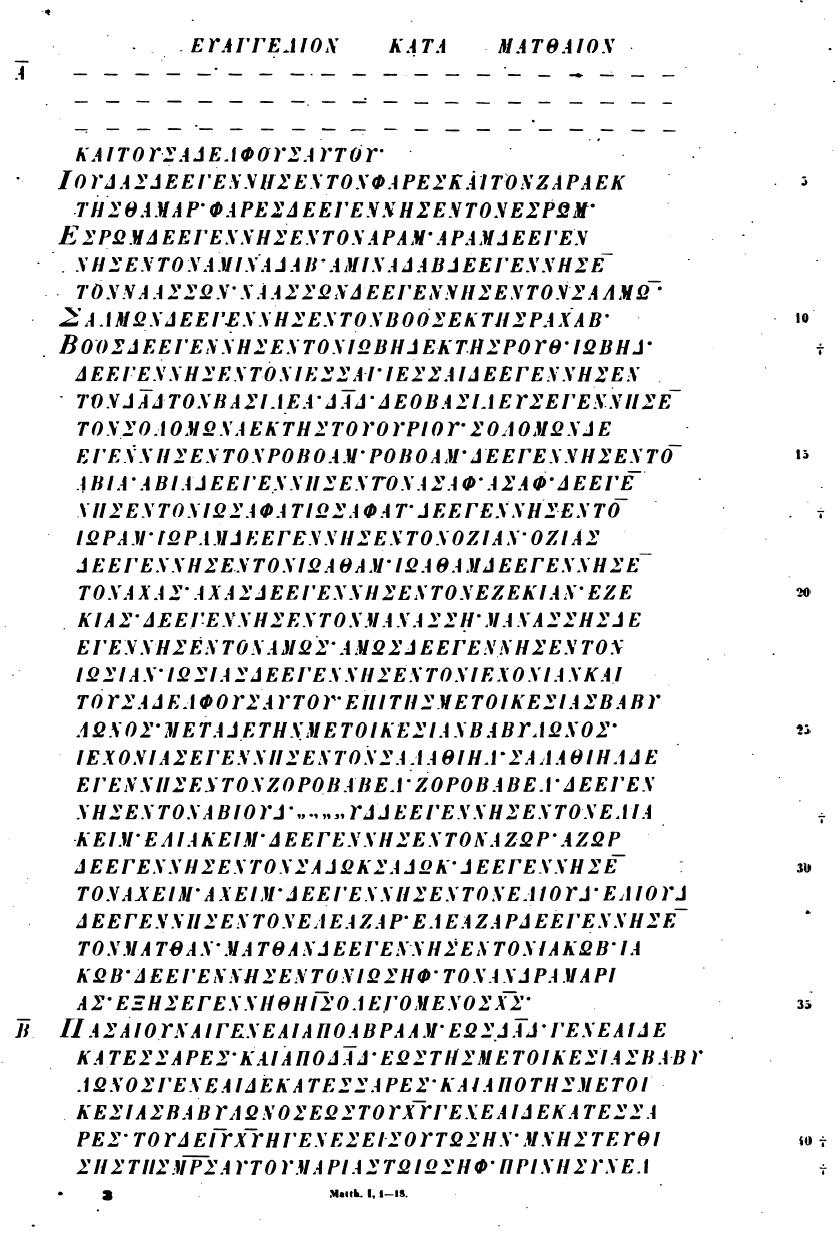
Matthew 1:2–18 in Tischendorf's facsimile edition

The New Testament text of the codex has been considered primarily as a representative of the Alexandrian text-type, although this affiliation varies from book to book. The text-types are groups of different New Testament manuscripts which share specific or generally related readings, which then differ from each other group, and thus the conflicting readings can separate out the groups. These are then used to determine the original text as published; there are three main groups with names: Alexandrian, Western, and Byzantine. It has a Byzantine affiliation in Matthew, a weak Alexandrian connection in Mark, and is considered an Alexandrian witness in John. In Luke its textual character is unclear. Textual critics Brooke Foss Westcott and Fenton J.A. Hort classified it as a mixed text; Hermann von Soden classified it as an Alexandrian witness.

According to textual critic Kurt Aland, it agrees with the Byzantine text-type 87 times in the Gospels, 13 times in Acts, 29 times in Paul, and 16 times in the Catholic epistles. It agrees with the Nestle-Aland text 66 times (Gospels), 38 (Acts), 104 (Paul), and 41 (Cath.). It has 50 independent or distinctive readings in the Gospels, 11 in Acts, 17 in Paul, and 14 in the Catholic epistles. Aland placed the text of the codex in Category II of his New Testament manuscript text classification system. Category II manuscripts are described as being manuscripts "of a special quality, i.e., manuscripts with a considerable proportion of the early text, but which are marked by alien influences. These influences are usually of smoother, improved readings, and in later periods by infiltration by the Byzantine text." According to the Claremont Profile Method (a specific analysis method of textual data), its text is mixed in Luke 1, Luke 10, and Luke 20. In the Book of Revelation, the codex is a witness to a similar form of text as seen in 02 and 𝔓^{115}.

The manuscript is cited in all critical editions of the Greek New Testament (UBS3, UBS4, NA26, NA27). In NA27 it belongs to the witnesses consistently cited of the first order. The readings of the codex correctors (C^{1}, C^{2}, and C^{3}) are regularly cited in critical editions.

=== Notable readings ===
Below are some readings of the manuscript which agree or disagree with variant readings in other Greek manuscripts, or with varying ancient translations of the New Testament. See the main article Textual variants in the New Testament.

Interpolations

Matthew 8:13

και υποστρεψας ο εκατονταρχος εις τον οικον αυτου εν αυτη τη ωρα ευρεν τον παιδα υγιαινοντα (and when the centurion returned to the house in that hour, he found the slave well - see Luke 7:10)

incl. - C א*^{, c2b} N Θ ƒ^{1} 33 545 g^{1} sy^{h}
omit - Majority of manuscripts

Matthew 27:49

ἄλλος δὲ λαβὼν λόγχην ἒνυξεν αὐτοῦ τὴν πλευράν, καὶ ἐξῆλθεν ὖδορ καὶ αἳμα (the other took a spear and pierced His side, and immediately came out water and blood - see John 19:34)

incl. - C א B L Γ 1010 1293 pc vg^{mss}
omit - Majority of manuscripts

Acts 14:19

και διαλεγομενων αυτων παρρησια επεισαν τους οχλους αποστηναι απ' αυτων λεγοντες, οτι ουδεν αληθες λεγουσιν αλλα παντα ψευδονται - C 6 36 81 104 323 326 453 945 1175 1739 2818 sy^{h(mg)}
και πεισαντης τους οχλους - Majority of manuscripts

Some corrections

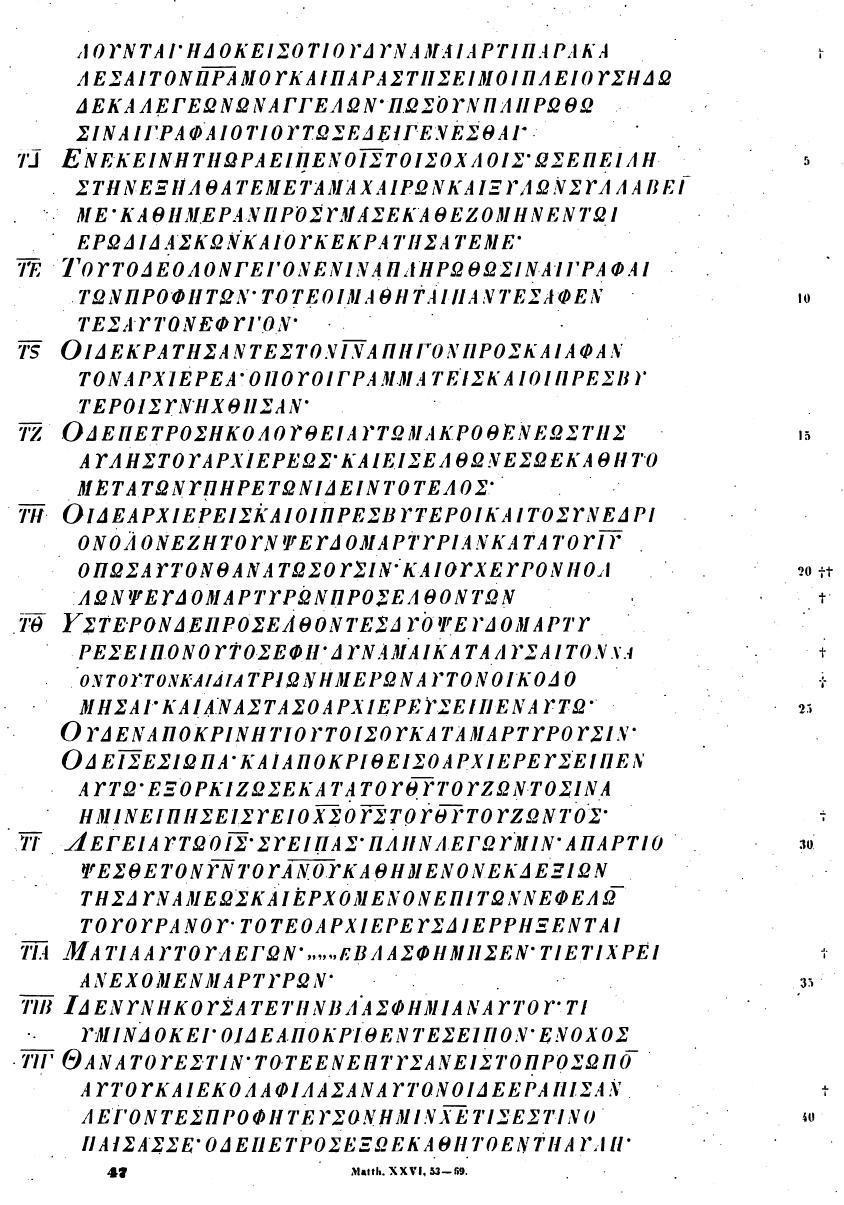
Matthew 26:52–69 in Tischendorf's facsimile edition (1843)

Matthew 11:2

δια (by) - C* א B D P W Z Δ Θ 0233 ƒ^{13} 33
δυο (two) - C^{3} L ƒ^{>1} Byz

Acts 20:28

του κυριου (of the Lord) - C* 𝔓^{74} D E Ψ 33 36 453 945 1739 1891
του κυριου και του Θεου (and God) - C^{c} P 049 326 1241 2492 Byz (Note: For the textual variants in this verse see: Textual variants in the Acts of the Apostles.)

1 Corinthians 12:9

εν τω αυτω πνευματι (in His spirit)

omit - C*
incl. - C^{3} Majority of manuscripts

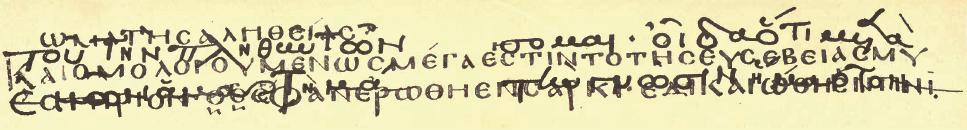
Scrivener's facsimile with text of 1 Tim 3:15–16

1 Timothy 3:16

ὅς ἐφανερώθη (He was manifested) - C* א* A* F G 33 365 1175
θεός ἐφανερώθη (God was manifested) - C^{2} א^{3} A^{2} Majority of manuscripts (Note: For the textual variants in this verse see: Textual variants in 1 Timothy.)

James 1:22

λογου (of the word) - C* Majority of manuscripts
νομου (of the law) - C^{2} 88 621 1067 1852

Some other textual variants

Matthew 22:10

αγαμος - C
νυμφων - א B* L 0102 892 1010 sy^{h(mg)}
γαμος - Majority of manuscripts

Mark 10:35

οι δυο υιοι Ζεβεδαιου (the two sons of Zebedee) - C B sa bo
οι υιοι Ζεβεδαιου (the sons of Zebedee) - Majority of manuscripts

Acts 15:23

γραψαντης δια χειρος αυτων επιστολην περιεχουσαν ταδε (they wrote by their hands the letter containing this) - C gig w geo
γραψαντης δια χειρος αυτων (wrote by their hands) - 𝔓^{33}^{(vid)} 𝔓^{45}^{(vid)} 𝔓^{74} א* A B bo eth
γραψαντης δια χειρος αυτων ταδε (they wrote this by their hands) - Majority of manuscripts

Romans 16:15

Ιουνιαν, Νηρεα - C* F G
Ιουλιαν, Νηρεα - C^{c} Majority of manuscripts

Romans 16:24

omit - C 𝔓^{46} 𝔓^{61} א A B 5 811 263 623 1739 1838 1962 2127 it^{z} vg^{ww} sa bo eth^{ro} Origen^{lat}
incl. - Majority of manuscripts

1 Corinthians 2:1

μυστηριον (secret) - C 𝔓^{46} א* Α 88 436 it^{a,r} syr^{p} bo
σωτηριον (savior) - ℓ 598 ℓ 593 ℓ 599
μαρτυριον (testimony) - Majority of manuscripts

1 Corinthians 7:5

τη προσευχη (prayer) - C 𝔓^{11} 𝔓^{46} א* A B D G P Ψ 33 81 104 181 629 630 1739 1877 1881 1962 it vg co arm eth
τη νηστεια και τη προσευχη (fasting and prayer) - א^{c2} Majority of manuscripts

2 Timothy 4:10

Γαλλιαν - C א 81 104 326 436 sa bo^{pt}
Γαλατιαν - Majority of manuscripts

James 1:12

κυριος (Lord) - C
ο κυριος (the Lord) - Majority of manuscripts
ο θεος (God) - 4 33^{(vid)} 323 2816^{(vid)} 945 1739 vg sy^{p}
omit - א A B Ψ 81 ff sa bo

Revelation 1:5

λυσαντι ημας εκ (freed us from) - C 𝔓^{18} א^{c} A 2020 2081 2814
λουσαντι ημας εκ (washed us from) - Majority of manuscripts

Revelation 13:18

εξακοσιαι δεκα εξ (six hundred sixteen / 616) - C 𝔓^{115}; Ir^{lat}
εξακοσιαι εξηκοντα εξ (666) - Majority of manuscripts

== History ==
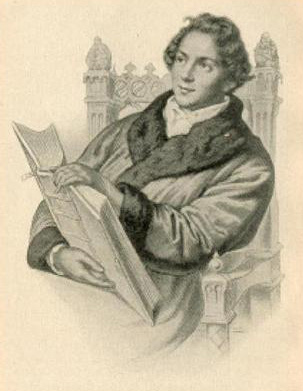
Tischendorf in 1841

The manuscript's place of origin is unknown. Tischendorf tentatively suggested Egypt. Tischendorf also proposed the manuscript was produced by two scribes: one for the Old Testament, and one for the New Testament. Subsequent research indicates there may have been a third scribe involved. The text has been corrected by three correctors, designated by C^{1}, C^{2}, and C^{3}, with Tischendorf designating them by C*, C**, and C***; they are sometimes designated by C^{a}, C^{b}, and C^{c}. The first corrector (C^{1}) worked in a scriptorium, but the exact location where any of the correctors worked is unknown. The first corrector's corrections are not numerous except in the Book of Sirach.

The third and last corrector (C^{3}) likely wrote in the 800s, possibly in Constantinople (modern day Istanbul in Turkey). He conformed readings of the codex to ecclesiastical use, inserting many accents, breathings, and vocal notes. He also added liturgical directions in the margin, and worked extensively on the codex. The codex was subsequently washed of its text, had the pages scrapped (albeit imperfectly), and reused in the twelfth century.

After the fall of Constantinople in 1453, the codex was brought to Florence by an émigré scholar. It belonged to Niccolo Ridolpho († 1550), Cardinal of Florence. After his death it was probably bought by Piero Strozzi, an Italian military leader, for Catherine de' Medici. Catherine brought it to France as part of her dowry, and from the Bourbon royal library it came to rest in the Bibliothèque nationale de France, Paris. The manuscript was rebound in 1602.

The older writing was first noticed by Pierre Allix, a Protestant pastor. Jean Boivin, supervisor of the Royal Library, made the first extracts of various readings of the codex (under the notation of Paris 9) to Ludolph Küster, who published Mill's New Testament in 1710. In 1834–1835 potassium ferricyanide was used to bring out faded or eradicated ink, which had the effect of defacing the vellum from green and blue to black and brown.

The first collation of the New Testament was made in 1716 by Johann Jakob Wettstein for Richard Bentley, who intended to prepare a new edition of the Novum Testamentum Graece. According to Bentley's correspondence, it took two hours to read one page, and Bentley paid Wettstein £50. This collation was used by Wettstein in his own Greek New Testament of 1751–1752. Wettstein also made the first description of the codex. Wettstein examined the text of the Old Testament only occasionally, but he did not publish any of it. Various editors made occasional extracts from the manuscript, but Tischendorf was the first who read it completely (Old and New Testament). Tischendorf gained an international reputation when he published the Greek New Testament text in 1843, and the Old Testament in 1845. Although Tischendorf worked by eye alone, his deciphering of the palimpsest's text was remarkably accurate. The torn condition of many folios, and the ghostly traces of the text overlaid by the later one, made the decipherment extremely difficult. Even with modern aids like ultraviolet photography, not all the text is securely legible. Robert W. Lyon published a list of corrections to Tischendorf's edition in 1959. This was also an imperfect work.

According to Edward Miller (1886), the codex was produced "in the light of the most intellectual period of the early Church." According to Frederic Kenyon, "the original manuscript contained the whole Greek Bible, but only scattered leaves of it were used by the scribe of St. Ephraem's works, and the rest was probably destroyed".

Swete only examined the text of the Old Testament. According to him the original order of the Old Testament cannot be reconstructed. The scribe who converted the manuscript into a palimpsest used the leaves for his new text without regard to their original arrangement. The original manuscript was not a single volume. It is currently housed in the Bibliothèque nationale de France (shelf number Grec 9) in Paris.

== See also ==
- List of New Testament uncials
- Biblical manuscript

== Bibliography ==
Text of the codex

- Tischendorf, Constantin von (1843). Codex Ephraemi Syri rescriptus, sive Fragmenta Novi Testamenti. Lipsiae.
- Tischendorf, Constantin von (1845). Codex Ephraemi Syri rescriptus, sive Fragmenta Veteris Testamenti. Lipsiae.
- Lyon, Robert W. (1959). A Re-Examination of Codex Ephraemi Rescriptus. New Testament Studies. Vol. 5. pp. 260–272.

Description of the codex

- Comfort, Philip (2005). Encountering the Manuscripts: An Introduction to New Testament Paleography and Textual Criticism. Broadman & Holman Publishers.
- Fleck, Ferdinand Florens (1841). Ueber die Handschrift des neuen Testamentes, gewoehnlich Codex Ephraemi Syri rescriptus genannt, in der koeniglichen Bibliothek zu Paris. Hamburg.
- Hatch, William Henry (1939). The Principal Uncial Manuscripts of the New Testament. Chicago: The University of Chicago Press.
- Metzger, Bruce Manning (1981). Manuscripts of the Greek Bible: An Introduction to Palaeography. Oxford: Oxford University Press.
