= Uncial 0142 =

- New Testament manuscript
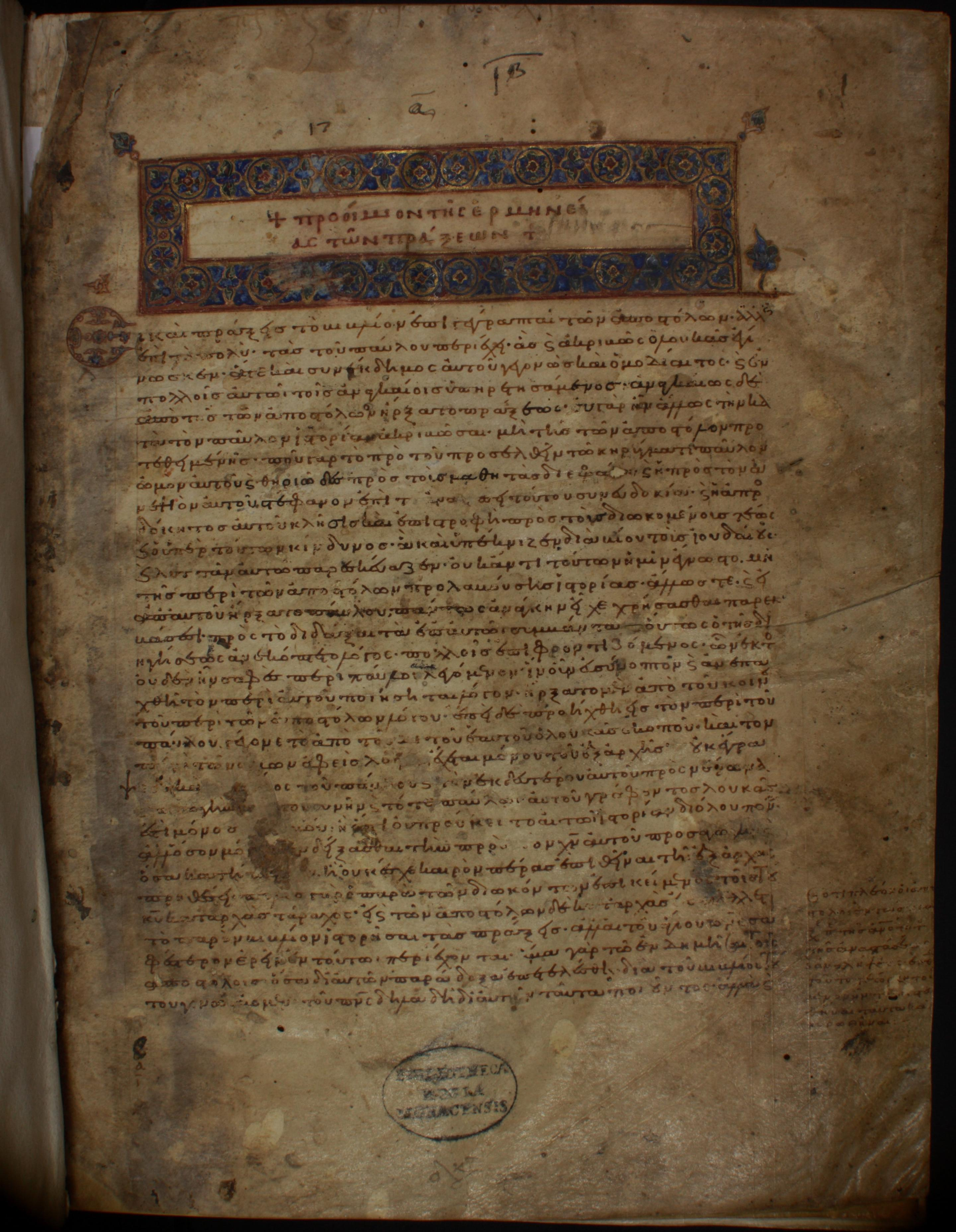
- Name: Codex Monacensis 375
- Text: Acts, Catholic epistles, Paul
- Date: 10th century
- Script: Greek
- Now at: Bayerische Staatsbibliothek
- Size: 32 x 24.5 cm
- Type: Byzantine text-type
- Category: V

Uncial 0142 (in the Gregory-Aland numbering), O^{6} (Soden), is a Greek uncial manuscript of the New Testament, dated paleographically to the 10th century. Formerly it was classified as a minuscule manuscript of New Testament under numbers 46^{a} 55^{p} (Scrivener).

== Description ==
The codex contains the complete Acts, Catholic epistles, and Pauline epistles, on 381 parchment leaves (32 cm by 24.5 cm). It is written in one column per page, 40 lines per page, in uncial letters, but uncial letters are mixed with minuscule letters. It contains a commentary of Pseudo-Oecumenius.

It contains stichoi.

== Text ==
The Greek text of this codex is a representative of the Byzantine text-type. Aland placed it in Category V. Uncial 056 probably was rewritten from the codex 0142.

It lacks Acts 8:37.

In Acts 18:26 it reads την του θεου οδον along with P, Ψ, 049, 104, 330, 451, 1241, 1877, 2127, 2492, Byz, Lect;

In Acts 20:15 it reads και μειναντες εν Στρογγυλιω along with 056.

== History ==
Currently it is dated by the INTF to the 10th century.

The manuscript was examined by Bengel, Matthai, and Scholz. Scholz examined Acts 3-20 and 1 Cor 1-3. C. R. Gregory saw it in 1887.

Formerly the manuscript was held in Augsburg. It came to Munich in 1806. It is currently housed at the Bayerische Staatsbibliothek (Gr. 375) in Munich.

== See also ==
- List of New Testament uncials
- Biblical manuscript
- Textual criticism
