= Codex Sangallensis 1395 =

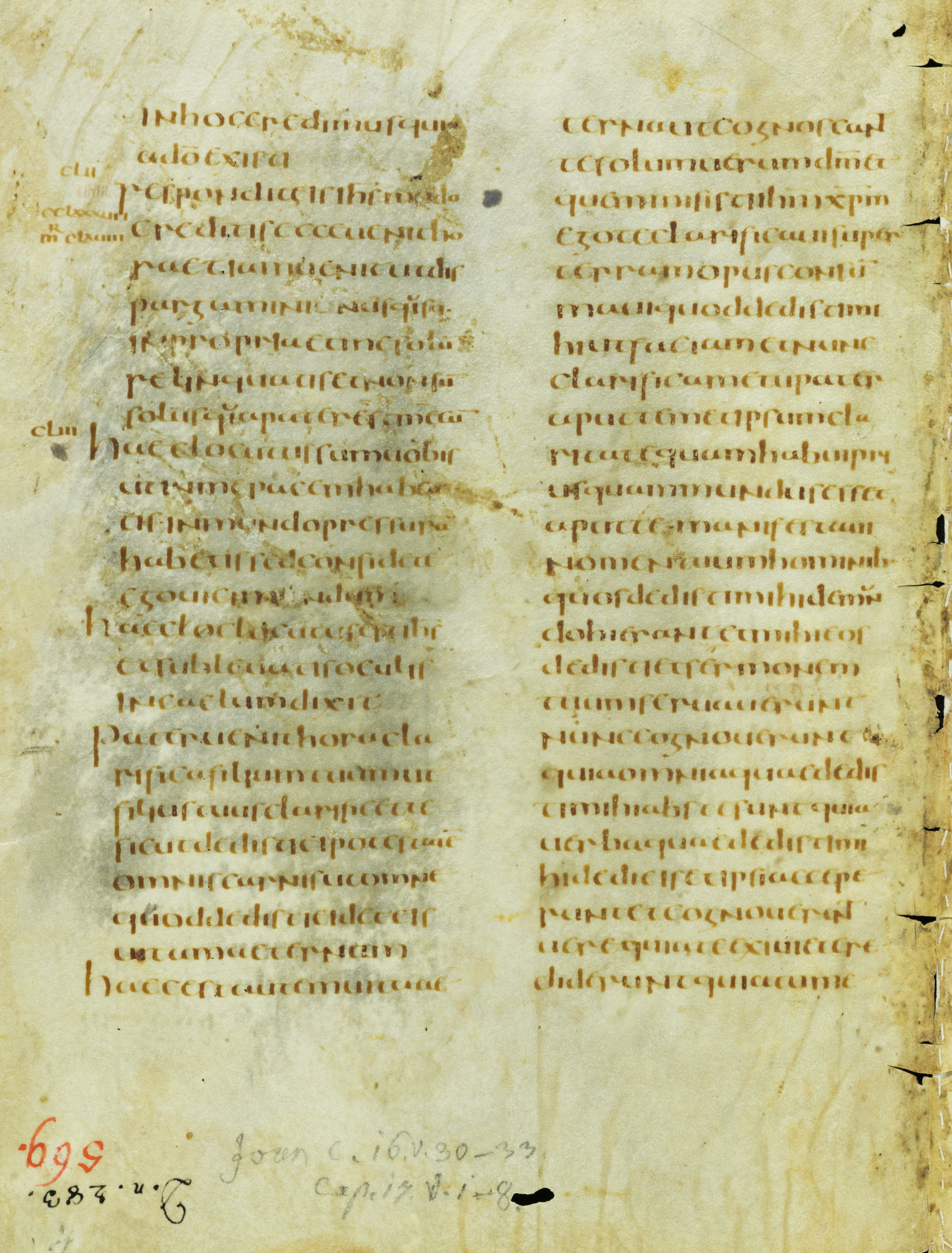
Page of the codex with text of John 16:30–17:8

Codex Sangallensis 1395 is a 19th-century compilation of fragments, and includes a 5th-century Latin manuscript of the New Testament, designated by Σ. The text, written on vellum, is a version of the Latin Vulgate.

== Description ==
The collection contains the text of the four Gospels (Matthew 6:21–Johannes 17:18), with numerous lacunae. The Latin text of the Gospels is representative of the Latin Vulgate. It contains 473 parchment leaves (24 by 18.5 cm). The leaves are arranged in quarto.

The order of Gospels is usual.

The nomina sacra are written in an abbreviated way. The words at the end of line are abbreviated. It also uses a few other abbreviations. Hebrew names like Ααρων, Ισαακ, Αβρααμ, Βεθλεεμ were Latinized by dropping one of the repeated vowels, or by insertion of the letter "h" between them. Although the Vetus Latina standard forms were Aron and Isac, forms like Aron and Aharon, Isac and Isahac, Bethlem and Bethlehem all occur in the manuscript.

It has some singular readings in the Gospel of Matthew (11:4; 14:2; 16:9.10; 17:26; 18:9; 26:45.47; 27:59; 28:1) and in Mark (4:7; 4:11; 6:33; 14:21).

The collection also includes a number of Irish fragments from the 7th and 10th century, including an illustration of Matthew (p. 418). On the blank verso side of the portrait there are incantations and supplications written by three different writers in a mixture of Latin and possibly Old Irish. Both pre-Christian deities and the Christian God are invoked for the relief of health issues. A solitary leaf on page 422 depicts a decorated cross, and similarly to the Matthew fragment contains a text in Irish minuscule on the back, which comprises blessings and an exorcism. Page 426 depicts the illuminated Irish fragment, which begins with PECCAVIMUS DOMINE PECCAVIMUS PARCE N[obis] ("We have sinned, Lord, we have sinned, forgive us"). This fragment shows a strong resemblance to fragments and manuscripts from the Irish midlands, among them Cod. Sang. 51. As such, it may have originated at the same time and in the same region.

== History ==
The manuscript was written in Verona in the 5th century. E. A. Lowe even thought it possible that the manuscript could have been written during the lifetime of Jerome. It is also dated to the 6th century. It is probably the oldest manuscript of the Latin Vulgate.

In the Middle Ages it was used for rebinding other manuscripts and about half of the codex has survived.

The text was published by C. H. Turner, A. Dold.

It is housed at the Abbey library of Saint Gall (Cod. Sang. 1395) in St. Gallen, Switzerland.

== See also ==
- List of New Testament Latin manuscripts
- Codex Sangallensis 18
- Codex Sangallensis 51
