= Minuscule 2344 =

Greek manuscript

- New Testament manuscript
- Text: Acts, CE, Paul, Rev
- Date: 11th century
- Script: Greek
- Now at: Bibliothèque nationale de France
- Size: 36.9 by 28 cm
- Type: Alexandrian / mixed
- Category: I/III
- Note: unique textual variants

Minuscule 2344 (in the Gregory-Aland numbering), is a Greek minuscule manuscript of the New Testament.

== Description ==
The codex contains the text of the Acts, CE, Paul, Rev, on 61 parchment leaves (36.9 by 28 cm). Paleographically it has been assigned to the 11th century, with some lacunae.

== Text ==
The Greek text of the codex is a representative of the Alexandrian text-type in the Catholic epistles and in the Book of Revelation. In the Book of Revelation it agrees frequently with Minuscule 2053. It contains also parts of Old Testament. Aland placed it in Category I. The text of the Acts and Pauline epistles Aland placed in Category III.

In Revelation textual value of the codex is comparable with codices Alexandrinus and Ephraemi.

In Revelation 16:5 it is the only extant Greek manuscript to include κυριε.

== History ==
In Revelation 13:18 it contains unique textual variant "its number is six hundred sixty-five".

The text was collated by J. Schmid. New collation gave M. Davies.

It is currently housed at the Bibliothèque nationale de France (Coislin Gr. 18, fol. 170-230) at Paris.

== See also ==
- List of New Testament minuscules (2001–)
- Biblical manuscript
- Textual criticism
