= Papyrus 11 =

Papyrus 𝔓^{11}
- New Testament manuscript
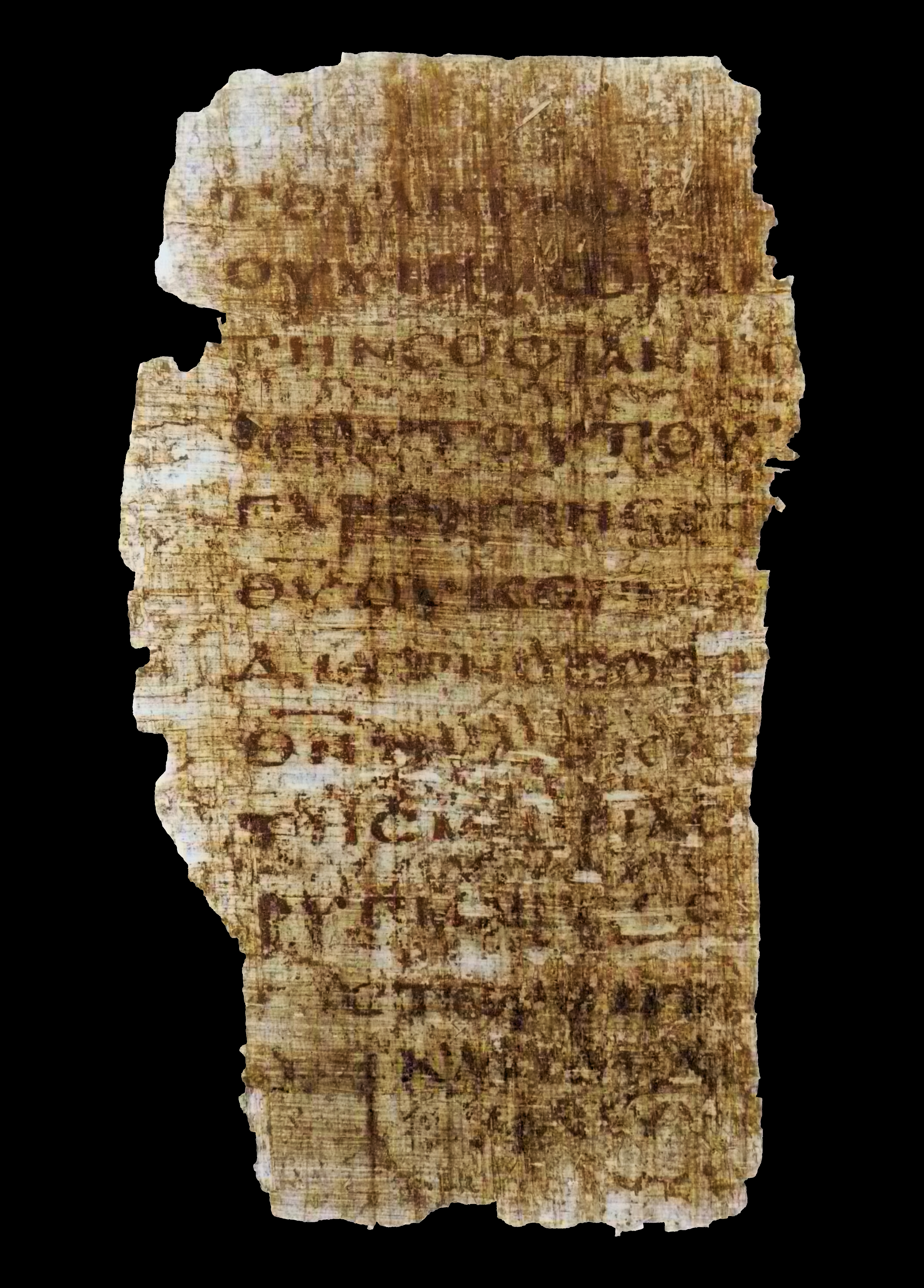
- Papyrus 11, Fragment 1 v — 1 Corinthians 1, 20-22
- Text: 1 Corinthians 1-7 †
- Date: 7th century
- Script: Greek
- Found: Tischendorf 1862
- Now at: Russian National Library
- Cite: K. Aland, Neutestamentliche Papyri NTS 3 (1957), pp. 267-278.
- Type: Alexandrian text-type
- Category: II

Papyrus 11 (in the Gregory-Aland numbering), signed by 𝔓^{11}, is a copy of a part of the New Testament in Greek. It is a papyrus manuscript of the First Epistle to the Corinthians. It contains fragments 1 Corinthians 1:17–22; 2:9–12.14; 3:1–3,3:5–6; 4:3; 5:5–5.7–8; 6:5–9.11–18; 7:3–6.10–11.12–14. Only some portions of the codex can be read.

The manuscript palaeographically had been assigned to the 7th century.

The Greek text of this codex is a representative of the Alexandrian text-type. Aland placed it in Category II.

In 1 Corinthians 7:5 it reads τη προσευχη (prayer) – along with 𝔓^{46}, א*, A, B, C, D, F, G, P, Ψ, 6, 33, 81, 104, 181, 629, 630, 1739, 1877, 1881, 1962, it vg, cop, arm, eth; other manuscripts have reading τη νηστεια και τη προσευχη (fasting and prayer) or τη προσευχη και νηστεια (prayer and fasting).

The manuscript was discovered by Tischendorf in 1862.

It is currently housed at the Russian National Library (Gr. 258A) in Saint-Petersburg.

== See also ==
- 1 Corinthians
- List of New Testament papyri
- Papyrus 14
