= Lectionary 249 =

Lectionary ℓ 249
- New Testament manuscript
- Text: Evangelistarium
- Date: 9th century
- Script: Greek
- Found: 1859
- Now at: Russian National Library
- Size: 19.7 cm by 14.6 cm

Lectionary 249 is a Greek manuscript of the New Testament written on parchment. It is designated by the siglum ℓ 249 in the Gregory-Aland numbering of New Testament manuscripts. Using the study of comparative writing styles (palaeography), it has been assigned to the 9th century. Biblical scholar Frederick H. A. Scrivener labelled it as 191^{evl}.

== Description ==
The manuscript is a codex (precursor to the modern book format) containing weekly lessons/readings from the Gospels and Epistles, known as a lectionary (Evangelistarium, Apostolarium). It contains 10 lessons from the Gospel of Matthew, 2 from Mark, 2 from Luke, 3 from John, 5 from Romans, 4 from Corinthians, 1 from Galatians, 1 from Ephesians, and 1 from Hebrews.

The text is written in Greek uncial letters, on 69 parchment leaves (sized 19.7 cm by 14.6 cm), with one column and 14-17 lines per page. It has breathing and accents, but no use of the interrogative sign. It has errors of itacism. It also contains the conventional nomina sacra.

== History ==
The manuscript was brought in 1859 by biblical scholar and manuscript hunter Constantin von Tischendorf, who gave the first description of it.

The manuscript was examined and described by the Swiss-German theologian and palaeographer Eduard de Muralt. The manuscript was added to the list of New Testament manuscripts by Scrivener (number 191), and incorporated into Gregory's list (number 249). The manuscript is categorized as a "consistently cited witness" in the Nestle-Aland 28th edition for the Pauline letters (including Hebrews), but not for the Gospels.

It has been assigned by the Institute for New Testament Textual Research to the 9th century. It is currently housed at the Russian National Library (shelf number Gr.44) in Saint Petersburg.

== See also ==
- List of New Testament lectionaries
- Biblical manuscript
- Textual criticism
- Lectionary 248
