= Codex Porphyrianus =

Uncial 025
- New Testament manuscript
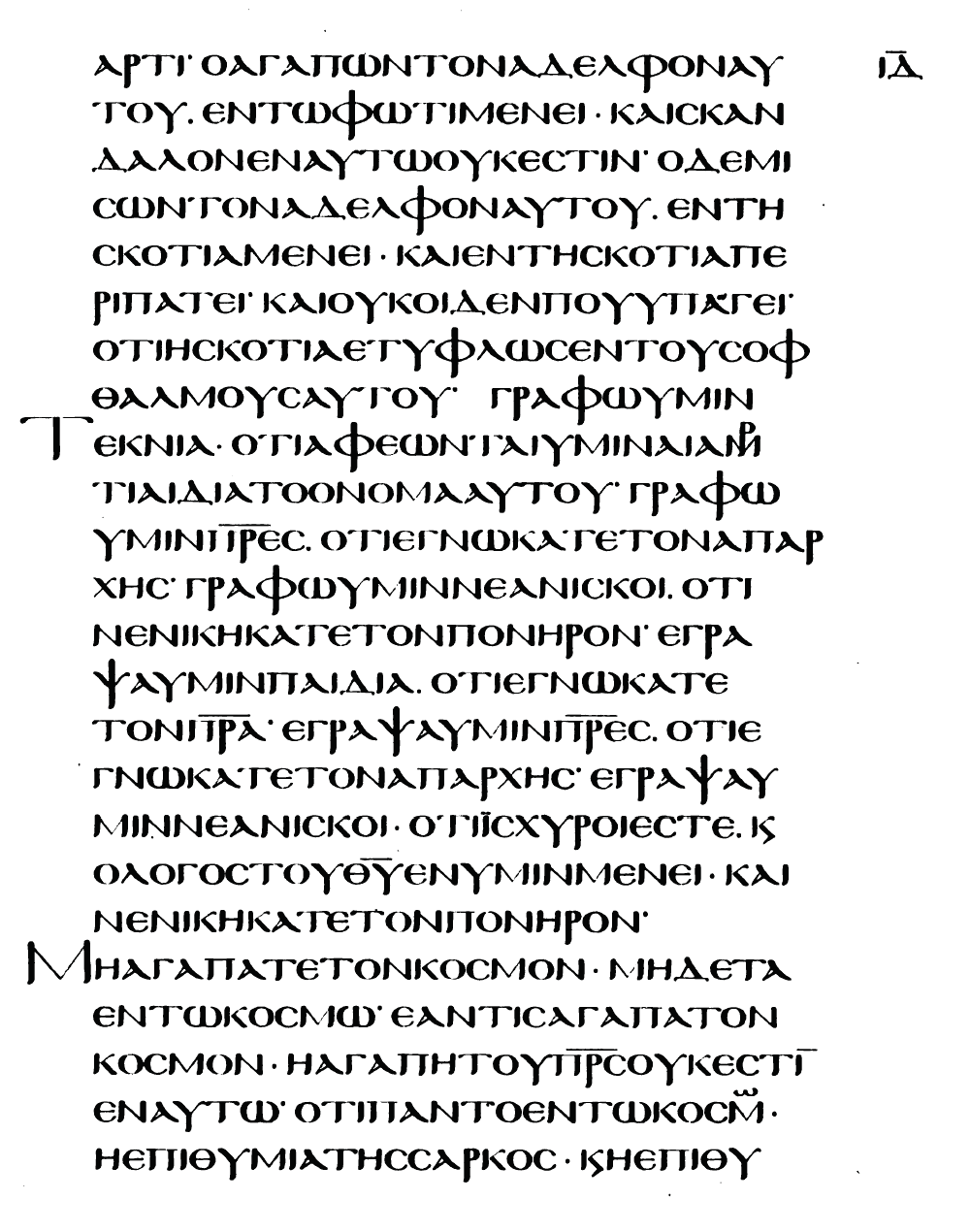
- 1 John 2:9-16 (facsimile); at the end of the 9th line an unusual abbreviation for "MAP"
- Name: Porphyrianus
- Sign: P^{apr}
- Text: Acts, General epistles, Paul, Rev
- Date: 9th century
- Script: Greek
- Found: 1862
- Now at: National Library of Russia
- Size: 16 cm by 13 cm
- Type: Alexandrian, and Byzantine text-type
- Category: III, V

Codex Porphyrianus designated by P^{apr} or 025 (in the Gregory-Aland numbering), α 3 (von Soden), is a Greek uncial manuscript of the Acts of Apostles, Pauline epistles, and General epistles, with some lacunae, dated paleographically to the 9th century. It is one of a few uncial manuscripts that include the Book of Revelation.

It was discovered and edited by Constantin von Tischendorf. The manuscript is lacunose.

== Description ==
The codex contains 327 parchment leaves (16 cm by 13 cm), written in one column per page, 24 lines per page. It is a palimpsest, the upper text is the codex 1834, dated to 1301. It contains the commentary of Euthalius on the Acts and the Pauline epistles together with the biblical text. It has breathings, accents, and apostrophes. The accents are often used wrongly. It has "Martyrdom of Peter and Paul" (between Pauline epistles and Book of Revelation).

It has errors of itacism. The letters αι and ε, η, ει and ι, ο and ω, and sometimes οι and υ are confused.

Ending of the Epistle to the Romans has the order of verses: 16:23; 16:25–27; 16:24 (as in codices 33 104 256 263 365 436 459 1319 1573 1852 arm).

At the end of the Second Epistle to Timothy it has the subscription Τιμοθεον Β' απο Ρωμης, the same as manuscripts 6, 1739, 1881.

Lacunae

Acts 1:1–2:13; Romans 2:16–3:4; 8:32–9:10; 11:23–12:1; 1 Cor. 7:15–17; 12:23–13:5; 14:23–39; 2 Cor. 2:13–16; Col. 3:16–4:8; 1 Thes. 3:5–4:17; 1 John 3:20–5:1; Jude 4–15; Rev. 16:12–17:1; 19:21–20:9; 22:6–end.

== Text ==
The Greek text of the Pauline and General epistles is a representative of the Alexandrian text-type with a large number of an alien readings. It is only a tertiary witness of the Alexandrian text. Aland placed it in Category III. Text of Acts and Revelation has typical Byzantine text-type. Aland placed it in Category V.

In Romans 8:1 it reads Ιησου κατα σαρκα περιπατουσιν αλλα κατα πνευμα, for Ιησου. The reading of the manuscript is supported by א^{c}, D^{c}, K, 33, 88, 104, 181, 326, 330, (436 omit μη), 456, 614, 630, 1241, 1877, 1962, 1984, 1985, 2492, 2495, Byz, Lect.

The ending of the Epistle to the Romans has an unusual order of verses: 16:23; 16:25–27; 16:24 (as in codices 33 104 256 263 365 436 459 1319 1573 1837 1852 syr^{p} arm).

In 1 Corinthians 7:5 it reads τη προσευχη (prayer) along with 𝔓^{11}, 𝔓^{46}, א*, A, B, C, D, F, G, Ψ, 6, 33, 81, 104, 181, 629, 630, 1739, 1877, 1881, 1962, it vg, cop, arm, eth. Other manuscripts read τη νηστεια και τη προσευχη (fasting and prayer) or τη προσευχη και νηστεια (prayer and fasting).

In 1 Timothy 3:16 it has textual variant θεός ἐφανερώθη (God manifested) (Sinaiticus^{e}, A^{2}, C^{2}, D^{c}, K, L, P, Ψ, 81, 104, 181, 326, 330, 436, 451, 614, 629, 630, 1241, 1739, 1877, 1881, 1962, 1984, 1985, 2492, 2495, Byz, Lect), against ὃς ἐφανερώθη (he was manifested) supported by Sinaiticus, Codex Alexandrinus, Ephraemi, Boernerianus, 33, 365, 442, 2127, ℓ 599.

In Hebrews 8:11 it reads πλησιον for πολιτην, the reading is supported by 81, 104, 436, 629, 630, and 1985.

In 1 Peter 4:14, the manuscript contains the variant reading κατὰ μὲν αὐτοὺς βλασφημεῖται, κατὰ δὲ ὑμᾶς δοξάζεται ("according to them he is blasphemed, but according to you he is glorified") along with manuscripts K L Ψ 1448 1611, the Byzantine Codices, a majority or all of the Old Latin witnesses, the Wordsworth/White Vulgate Edition, the Greek-manuscript-consulted Harklensis Syriac Vorlage, Sahidic manuscripts, one Bohairic manuscript, and the church father Cyprian (3rd Century).

In 1 John 5:6 it has textual variant δι' ὕδατος καὶ πνεύματος καὶ αἵματος (through water and spirit and blood) along with the manuscripts: 81, 88, 442, 630, 915, 2492, arm, eth. (Note: For another variants of this verse see: Textual variants in the First Epistle of John.) Bart D. Ehrman identified it as Orthodox corrupt reading.

In Rev 1:5 it reads λουσαντι ημας απο along with 046, 94, 1006, 1859, 2042, 2065, 2073, 2138, 2432.

In Revelation 8:13 it reads αγγελου along with 104, 205, 254, 336, 367, 620, 632 (corrector), 680, 922, 1773, 1876, 2026, 2028, 2029, 2037, 2044 (αγγελους), 2045, 2046, 2047, 2049, 2056, 2057, 2059, 2060, 2067, 2073, 2074, 2081, 2186, 2286, 2302, 2436, 2449, 2493, 2595, 2681, 2814, 2886, and 2919.

== History ==
The manuscript was discovered by Tischendorf in 1862 at Saint Petersburg in the possession of the Archimandrite Porphyrius Uspensky, who allowed him to take it to Leipzig to decipher lower script. Tischendorf edited its text in Monumenta sacra inedita vol. V-VI (1865–1869).

The codex is located now at the National Library of Russia (Gr. 225), in Saint Petersburg.

== See also ==
- Biblical manuscript
- List of New Testament uncials
- Textual criticism
