= Uncial 056 =

- New Testament manuscript
- Text: Acts, Paul, GE
- Date: 10th century
- Script: Greek
- Now at: National Library of France
- Size: 29.8 cm x 23.3 cm
- Type: Byzantine
- Category: V

Uncial 056 (in the Gregory-Aland numbering), O^{7} (von Soden), is a Greek uncial manuscript of the New Testament, dated paleographically to the 10th century.

== Description ==
The codex contains a complete text of the Acts of Apostles, General epistles, and Pauline epistles with a commentary much like Oecumenius, and a catena of various Fathers, on 381 parchment leaves (29.8 cm by 23.3 cm). The text is written in one column per page, 40 lines per page in uncial letters. It contains Prolegomena.

It contains also a Life of St. Longinus on two leaves. F. H. A. Scrivener classified it as a minuscule (16^{a} and 19^{p}).

== Text ==
The Greek text of this codex is a representative of the Byzantine text-type, with the strong the Alexandrian element in General epistles (about 20%). Aland placed it in Category V. Uncial 0142 was probably the ancestor of the codex 056.

It lacks verse Acts 8:37.

In Acts 20:15 it reads και μειναντες εν Στρογγυλιω along with 0142.

== History ==
Currently it is dated by the INTF to the 10th century.

The manuscript formerly belonged to the monastery of St. Athanasius on Athos. It was examined by Montfaucon, Wettstein, Tischendorf, and C. R. Gregory (1885).

The codex is located in Bibliothèque nationale de France, in Paris, as a part of Fonds Coislin (Coislin Gr. 26).

== See also ==
- List of New Testament uncials
- Textual criticism
