= Bible translations into Georgian =

Georgian manuscript of the Gospel of Matthew from the Alaverdi Gospels, 1054

The Bible was first translated into the Georgian language as early as the 5th century. The Vani Gospels (Vani Four Gospels; Georgian: ვანის ოთხთავი, Vanis otkhtavi) is an illuminated manuscript of the gospels in the Georgian Nuskhuri script dating from the end of the 12th–early 13th centuries. Recently a new translation was completed by the Institute for Bible Translation.
