= Lists of New Testament manuscripts =

The following articles contain lists of New Testament manuscripts:

== In Coptic ==
- List of Coptic New Testament manuscripts

== In Greek ==
- List of New Testament papyri
- List of New Testament uncials
- List of New Testament minuscules
  - List of New Testament minuscules (1–1000)
  - List of New Testament minuscules (1001–2000)
  - List of New Testament minuscules (2001–)
- List of New Testament lectionaries

== In Latin ==
- Vetus Latina manuscripts § New Testament
- Vulgate manuscripts § New Testament

== In Syriac ==
- List of Syriac New Testament manuscripts

== In Ge'ez ==
- Garima Gospel 1 and 2

== See also ==
- Biblical manuscript
  - List of Hebrew Bible manuscripts
  - Septuagint manuscripts
- Bible translations
  - Bible translations into Geʽez
  - List of Bible translations by language
- Categories of New Testament manuscripts
- Novum Testamentum Graece
