= Textual variants in the Epistle to the Romans =

Textual variants in the Epistle to the Romans are the subject of the study called textual criticism of the New Testament. Textual variants in manuscripts arise when a copyist makes deliberate or inadvertent alterations to a text that is being reproduced. An abbreviated list of textual variants in this particular book is given in this article below.

Most of the variations are not significant and some common alterations include the deletion, rearrangement, repetition, or replacement of one or more words when the copyist's eye returns to a similar word in the wrong location of the original text. If their eye skips to an earlier word, they may create a repetition (error of dittography). If their eye skips to a later word, they may create an omission. They may resort to performing a rearranging of words to retain the overall meaning without compromising the context. In other instances, the copyist may add text from memory from a similar or parallel text in another location. Otherwise, they may also replace some text of the original with an alternative reading. Spellings occasionally change. Synonyms may be substituted. A pronoun may be changed into a proper noun (such as "he said" becoming "Jesus said"). John Mill's 1707 Greek New Testament was estimated to contain some 30,000 variants in its accompanying textual apparatus which was based on "nearly 100 [Greek] manuscripts." Peter J. Gurry puts the number of non-spelling variants among New Testament manuscripts around 500,000, though he acknowledges his estimate is higher than all previous ones.

== Legend ==
A guide to the sigla (symbols and abbreviations) most frequently used in the body of this article.

General sigla
# beginning with 0: uncial
# not beginning with 0: minuscule
^{*} superscript: original reading
^{c} superscript: scribal correction
^{ms} superscript: individual manuscript
^{mss} superscript: multiple manuscripts
^{pt} superscript: partial attestation
^{vid} superscript: uncertain reading
arab: Arabic versions
arm: Armenian versions
𝔐 or Byz: Byzantine text-type
cop: Coptic versions

sa: Sahidic version
bo: Boharic version

eth: Ethiopic versions
ƒ: Greek manuscripts family
geo: Georgian versions
goth: Gothic versions
it: Italic/Vetus Latina
lat: most Italic and Vulgate
latt: all Italic and Vulgate
𝔓: papyrus
𝑙: individually numbered lectionary
Lect: most or all numbered lectionaries
parenthesized (): approximate reading
rell: all other extant manuscripts
slav: Slavic versions
syr: Syriac versions
vg: Latin Vulgate
ς: Textus Receptus

Uncial sigla
א: Codex Sinaiticus (01)
A: Codex Alexandrinus (02)
B: Codex Vaticanus (03)
C: Codex Ephraemi Rescriptus (04)
D^{ea}: Codex Bezae (05)
D^{p}: Codex Claromontanus (06)
K^{e}: Codex Cyprius (017)
K^{ap}: Codex Mosquensis I (018)
L^{e}: Codex Regius (New Testament) (019)
L^{ap}: Codex Angelicus (020)
P^{apr}: Codex Porphyrianus (025)
S: Codex Vaticanus 354 (028)
V: Codex Mosquensis II (031)
W: Codex Washingtonianus (032)
Z: Codex Dublinensis (035)
Γ: Codex Tischendorfianus IV (036)
Δ: Codex Sangallensis 48 (037)
Θ: Codex Koridethi (038)
Ξ: Codex Zacynthius (040)
Π: Codex Petropolitanus (New Testament) (041)
Φ: Codex Beratinus (043)
Ψ: Codex Athous Lavrensis (044)
Ω: Codex Athous Dionysiou (045)
ff^{1}: Codex Corbeiensis I
ff^{2}: Codex Corbeiensis II
g^{1}: Codex Sangermanensis I
k: Codex Bobiensis

Critical editions
T8th: Tischendorf's 8th Edition of Editio Octava Critica Maior
WH: Westcott and Hort (1881)
NA: Novum Testamentum Graece (Nestle–Aland)
UBS: United Bible Societies
ECM: Editio Critica Maior

== Textual variants ==
Textual variants in the Epistle to the Romans

4 Textual variants in Romans 1

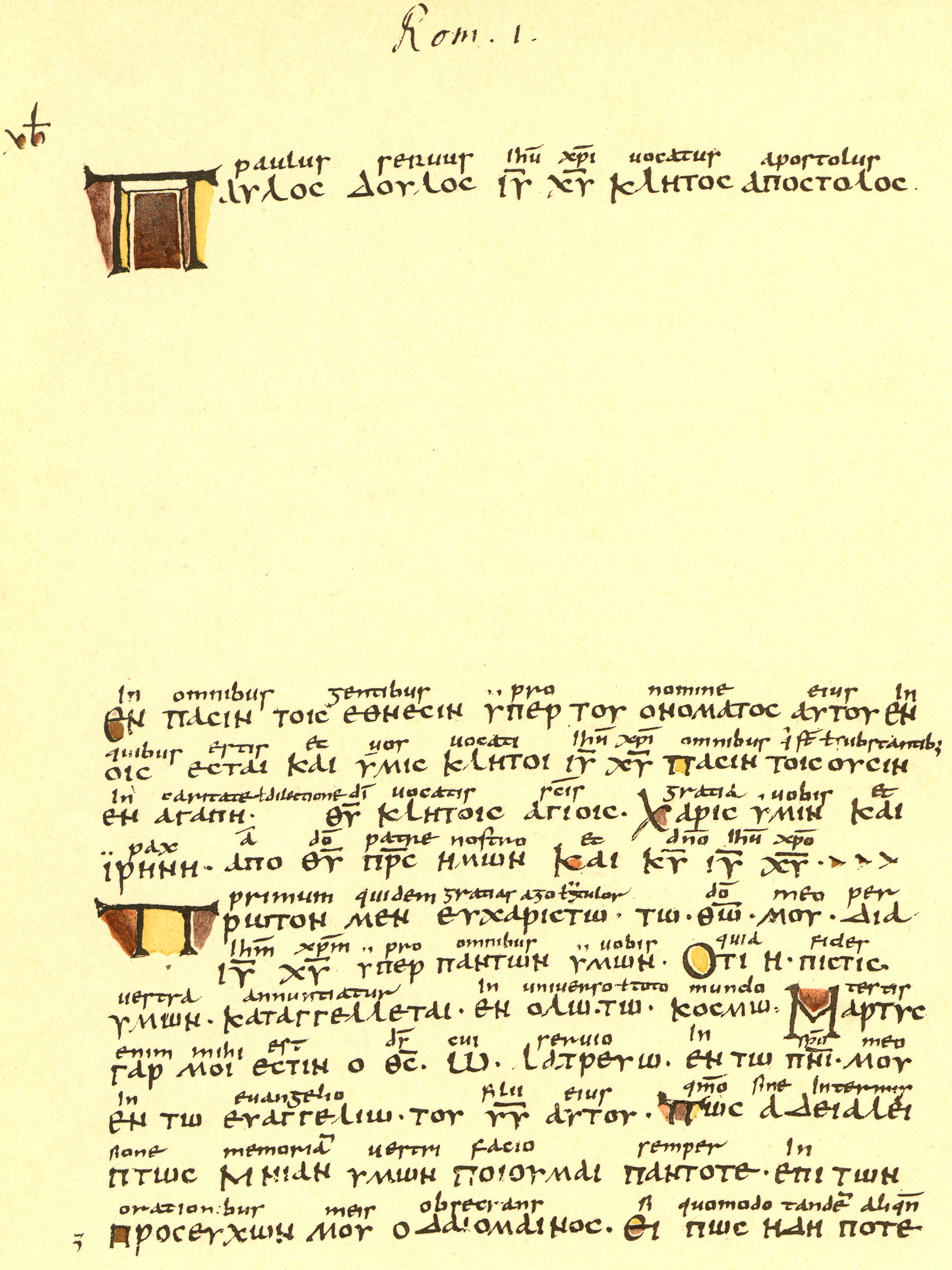
First page of the Codex Boernerianus; in Romans 1:7 "in Rome" replaced into "in love"

Romans 1:7

ἐν Ῥώμῃ (in Rome) – א A B C D K P Ψ 33 81 88 104 181 330 436 451 614 629 630 1241 1739^{txt} 1877 1881 1962 1984 1985 2127 2492 2495 Byz Lect it vg syr cop arm Origen Ambst. Augustine
ἐν ἀγάπῃ θεοῦ (in love of God) – Codex Boernerianus
omitted by 1739^{mg} 1908 Origen

Romans 1:8

περι – א A B C D* K 33 81 1506 1739 1881
υπερ – D^{c} G Ψ Byz

Romans 1:15

ἐν Ῥώμῃ – omitted by G^{a}

Romans 1:29

πονηρια πλεονεξια κακια – B 0172^{vid} 1739 1881 Origen Basil
πονηρια κακια πλεονεξια – א A cop^{bo^{mss}}
κακια πονηρια πλεονεξια – C D^{supp.c} 33 81 cop^{sa, bo} eth
κακια πορνεια πλεονεξια – D^{supp.*} G (629 add πονηρια) it^{d, e, g}
πορνεια πονηρια πλεονεξια κακια – L Ψ (88 add και after each word) 326 330 436 451 614 630 1241 1877 1962 1984 1985 2127 2492 2495 Byz Lect syr^{h} arm
πορνεια αδικια πλεονεξια κακια – 181
πονηρια πορνεια πλεονεξια κακια – 104 vg?
και πορνεια πλεονεξια κακια – P
πλεονεξια κακια – K

0 Textual variants in Romans 2

Romans 2:1

1 Textual variants in Romans 3

Romans 3:26

Ἰησοῦ – א, A, B, C, K, P, 81, 88, 104, 181, 630, 1241, 1739, 1881, 1877, 1962, 2495, Byz, ℓ 598, ℓ 599, ℓ 603
Ἰησοῦν – D, Ψ, 33, 326, 330, 436, 451, 614, 1985, 2127, 2492
Ἰησοῦν Χριστόν – 1984
Ἰησοῦ Χριστοῦ – 629
κυρίου ἡμῶν Ἰησοῦ Χριστοῦ – syr^{p}
omit F, G, 336, it

0 Textual variants in Romans 4

Romans 4:1

0 Textual variants in Romans 5

Romans 5:1

3 Textual variants in Romans 6

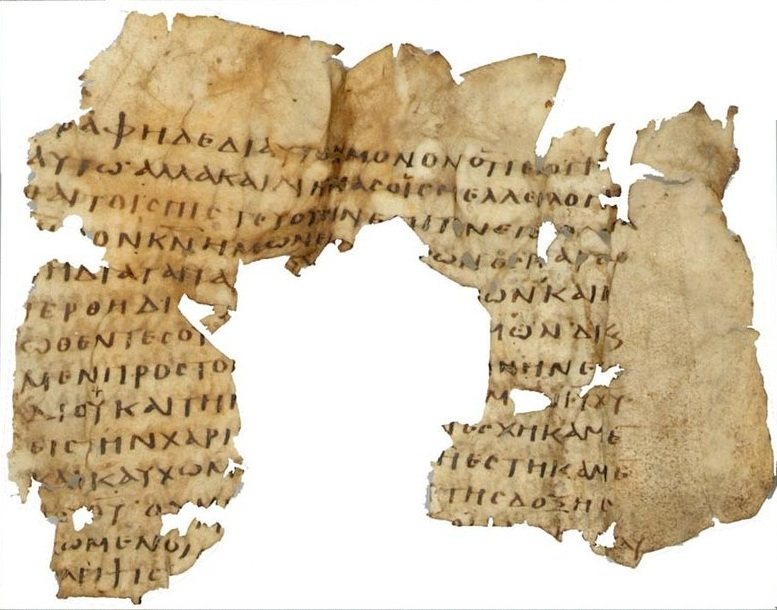
Romans 4:23-5:3 in Uncial 0220

Romans 6:11

ἐν Χριστῷ Ἰησοῦ – 𝔓^{46}, A, B, D, G, Ψ, 629, 630, 1739, it, vg
ἐν Χριστῷ Ἰησοῦ τῷ κυριῷ ἡμῶν – א, C, K, P, 33, 81, 88, 181, 326, 330, 436, 451, 614, 1241, 1739, 1877, 1881, 1962, 1984, 1985, 2127, 2492, 2495, Byz, Lect
ἐν Χριστῷ τῷ κυριῷ ἡμῶν – 104
omit it^{r}

Romans 6:16

εἰς θάνατον (for death) – omitted by D, 1739*, d, r, am, pesh, sa, arm^{mss}, Ambrosiaster

Romans 6:17

καρδιας – majority of mss
καθαρας – A

0 Textual variants in Romans 7

Romans 7

1 Textual variants in Romans 8

Romans 8:1

Ιησου – א, B, D, G, 1739, 1881, it^{d, g}, cop^{sa, bo}, eth
Ιησου μη κατα σαρκα περιπατουσιν – A, D^{b}, Ψ, 81, 629, 2127, vg
Ιησου μη κατα σαρκα περιπατουσιν αλλα κατα πνευμα – א^{c}, D^{c}, K, P, 33, 88, 104, 181, 326, 330, (436 omit μη), 456, 614, 630, 1241, 1877, 1962, 1984, 1985, 2492, 2495, Byz, Lect

1 Textual variants in Romans 9

Romans 9:11

κακον – 𝔓^{46}, D, F, G, Ψ, Byz
φαυλον – א, B, C, 6, 81, 365, 630, 945, 1506, 1739, 1881, al

1 Textual variants in Romans 10

Romans 10:21

καὶ ἀντιλέγοντα (and contrary) – omitted by F, G, g, Ambrosiaster, Hilary

1 Textual variants in Romans 11

Romans 11:1

τὸν λαόν – א, A, Β, C, D, K, P, Ψ, 33, 81, 88, 181, 330, 436, 451, 614, 629, 630, 1241, 1739, 1877, 1881, 1962, 1984, 1985, 2127, 2492, 2495, Byz, Lect, it^{ar, d, dem, e, z}, vg, syr^{p, h}, cop^{sa, bo}, arm, Origen, Eusebius, Chryzostom, Augustine, Theodoret
τὴν κληρονομίαν – 𝔓^{46}, G, it, goth, Ambrosiaster, Ambrose, Pelagius

2 Textual variants in Romans 12

Romans 12:9

ἀποστυγοῦντες τὸ πονηρόν – F, G, lat, syr replaced into μισουντες το πονηρον

Romans 12:11

κυριω – 𝔓^{46} א Α Β D^{b,c} P Ψ 33 81 88 104 181 326 330 436 451 614 629 630 1241 1739 1877 1881 1962 1984 1985 2127 2492 2495 Byz
καιρω – D* F G 5

2 Textual variants in Romans 13

Romans 13:1

υπο θεου – א Α Β D^{2} Ψ Byz
απο θεου – D* F G 629 945

Romans 13:9

ου ψευδομαρτυρησεις, ουκ επιθυμησεις – 01 048 81 88 104 326 330 365 436 451 629 1506 1962 1984 2127 2492 2495 Byz^{pt} ℓ 597 ℓ 598 ℓ 599 a b vg^{cl} (syr^{h}) cop^{bo}
ου ψευδομαρτυρησης, ουκ επιθυμησης – P
ουκ επιθυμησεις – 𝔓^{46} Α Β D F G L Ψ 6 33 181 614 630 1175 1241 1739 1877 1881 vgst syr^{p} cop^{sa}
ουκ επιθυμησεις, ου ψευδομαρτυρησεις – 2495

0 Textual variants in Romans 14

Romans 14:1

3 Textual variants in Romans 15

Romans 15:19

πνευματος θεου – 𝔓^{46} א D P Ψ 88 181 326 436 614 629 1241
πνευματος αγιου – A D G 33 81 104 630 1739
πνευματος θεου αγιου – 330 451

Romans 15:29

Χριστου – 𝔓^{46} א Α Β C D G P 81 629 630 1739 1881 ar d e f g x z vg^{ww} cop arm
του ευαγγελιου του Χριστου – א^{c} Ψ 33 88 104 181 326 330 436 451 614 1241 1877 1962 1984 2127 2492 2495 Byz Lect vg^{cl} syr^{p,h}
της διδαχης του Χριστου – eth^{ro}

Romans 15:31

διακονια – 𝔓^{46} א Α C D^{c} P Ψ 33 81 88 104 181 326 330 436 451 614 629 630 1241 1739 1877 1881 1962 1984 1985 2127 2492 2495 Byz Lect
δωροφορια – B D G^{gr}

4 Textual variants in Romans 16

Romans 16:15

Ιουλιαν, Νηρεα – א Α Β C^{2} D P Ψ 33 81 88 104 181 326 330 436 451 614 629 630 1241 1739 1877 1881 1962 1984 1985 2127 2492 2495 Byz Lect it vg syr cop arm
Βηρεα και Αουλιαν – 𝔓^{46}
Ιουνιαν, Νηρεα – C G^{gr}

Romans 16:20

ἡ χάρις τοῦ κυρίου ἡμῶν Ἰησοῦ (Χριστου) μεθ' ὑμῶν (The grace of our Lord Jesus (Christ) with you) – mss of the Alexandrian, Caesarean, and Byzantine text-types
omitted by D*^{vid}, F^{p}, G, d, f, g, m, bodl Ambrosiaster Pelagius^{ms}

Romans 16:24

Verse omitted by Codex Sinaiticus A B C 5 81 263 623 1739 1838 1962 2127 it^{z} vg^{ww} cop^{sa,bo} eth^{ro} Origen^{lat})
Verse included by D G Ψ 88 181 326 330 451 614 629 630 1241 1877 1881 1984 1985 2492 2495 Byz Lect it vg^{cl} syr^{h}
Verse included but following 16:27 P 33 104 256 436 1319 1837 syr^{p} arm

Romans 16:25-27

verses omitted by F, G, 629, d**?, g, goth?, Jerome^{mss}

== See also ==
- Alexandrian text-type
- Biblical inerrancy
- Byzantine text-type
- Caesarean text-type
- Categories of New Testament manuscripts
- Comparison of codices Sinaiticus and Vaticanus
- List of New Testament verses not included in modern English translations
- Textual variants in the New Testament
- Western text-type
