= Uncial 0201 =

- New Testament manuscript
- Text: 1 Corinthians 12:2-3,6-13; 14:20-29
- Date: 5th century
- Script: Greek
- Now at: British Library
- Size: 15 x 15 cm
- Type: Alexandrian text-type
- Category: II

Uncial 0201 (in the Gregory-Aland numbering), is a Greek uncial manuscript of the New Testament, dated paleographically to the 5th century.

== Description ==
The codex contains a small parts of the First Epistle to the Corinthians 12:2-3,6-13; 14:20-29, on two parchment leaves (15 cm by 15 cm). It is written in two columns per page, 19 lines per page, in very large uncial letters.

The Greek text of this codex is a representative of the Alexandrian text-type. Aland placed it in Category II.

In 1 Corinthians 12:9 it reads χαρισματα ιαματων εν τω αυτω πνευματι (along with א C^{3} D G K P 88 181 330 451 614 629 1241 1877 1962 1984 1985 2127 2492 2495 Byz Lect), NA27 reads χαρισματα ιαματων εν τω ενι πνευματι (like A B 33 81 104 436 630 1881 it vg).

The manuscript was added to the list of the New Testament manuscripts by Ernst von Dobschütz. Currently it is dated by the INTF to the 5th century.

It is cited in the Novum Testamentum Graece (NA26, NA27, NA28).

The codex currently is housed at the British Library (Pap. 2040) in London.

== See also ==
- List of New Testament uncials
- Textual criticism
