= Uncial 0243 =

10th century Manuscript of the New Testament Greek uncial manuscript

- New Testament manuscript
- Text: 1 Corinthians 13:42 - 2 Corinthians 13:13
- Date: 10th century
- Script: Greek
- Now at: Biblioteca Marciana
- Size: 32.5 cm by 24 cm
- Type: Alexandrian text-type
- Category: II

Uncial 0243 (in the Gregory-Aland numbering), is a Greek uncial manuscript of the New Testament. Paleographically it has been assigned to the 10th century.

== Description ==
The codex contains a part of the Pauline epistles, with text 1 Cor. 13:42 - 2 Cor. 13:13, on 7 parchment leaves (32.5 cm by 24 cm). The text is written in two columns per page, 48 lines per page, in uncial letters.

The Second Epistle to the Corinthians is complete.

Currently it is dated by the INTF to the 10th century.

The manuscript was added to the list of the New Testament manuscripts by Kurt Aland in 1963.

== Text ==
The Greek text of this codex is a representative of the Alexandrian text-type. Aland placed it in Category II.

In 1 Corinthians 15:47 it reads δευτερος ανθρωπος along with א*, B, C, D, F, G, 33, 1739, it, vg, cop^{bo} eth. Other manuscripts read δευτερος ο κυριος (630, δευτερος ανθρωπος ο κυριος (א^{c}, A, D^{c}, K, P, Ψ, 81, 104, 181, 326, 330, 436, 451, 614, 629, 1241, 1739^{mg}, 1877, 1881, 1984, 1985, 2127, 2492, 2495, Byz, Lect), δευτερος ανθρωπος πνευματικος (𝔓^{46}).

In 1 Corinthians 15:54 it lacks το φθαρτον τουτο ενδυσηται αφθαρσιαν και along with 088, 0121a, 1175, 1739;

In 2 Corinthians 11:14 it has reading ου θαυμα as have codices Sinaiticus, Vaticanus, Bezae, Augiensis, Boernerianus, Porphyrianus, Uncial 098, Minuscule 6, 33, 81, 326, 365, 630, 1175, 1739, 1881, 2464; the majority has the reading ου θαυμαστον (D^{2}, Ψ, 0121a, Byz).

== Location ==
Currently the codex is housed at the Biblioteca Marciana, 983 (II, 181) in Venice.

== See also ==
- List of New Testament uncials
- Textual criticism
- Uncial 0121b
