= Uncial 0121a =

- New Testament manuscript
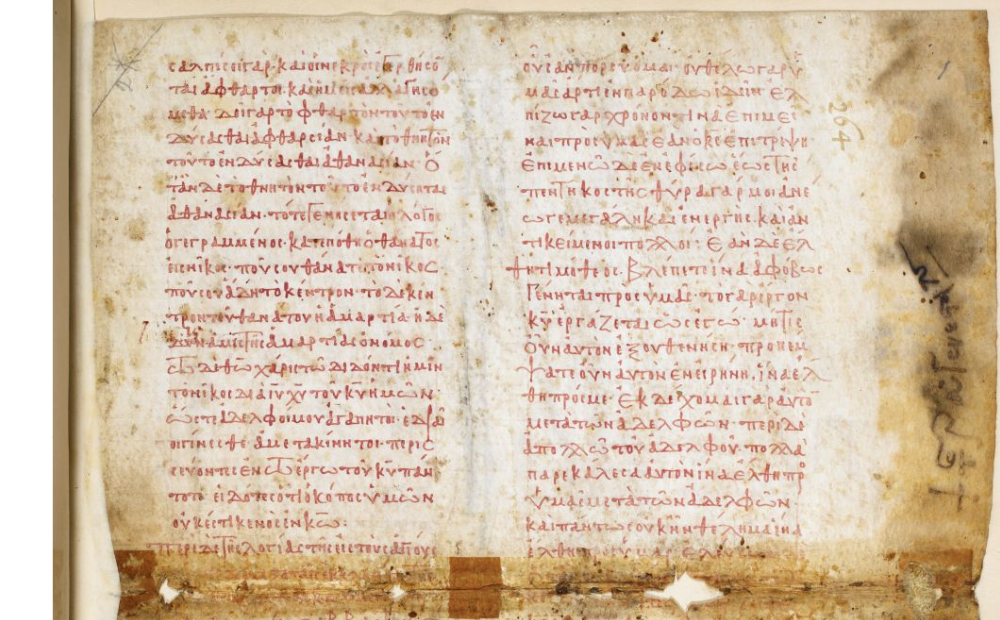
- 1 Cor 15:52-58; 2 Cor 1:1.6-13
- Text: 1 Corinthians; 2 Corinthians †
- Date: 10th-century
- Script: Greek
- Now at: British Library
- Size: 26 cm by 21 cm
- Type: Family 1739
- Category: III

Uncial 0121a (in the Gregory-Aland numbering), α 1031 (Soden), is a Greek uncial manuscript of the New Testament, dated paleographically to the 10th-century.

== Description ==
The codex contains parts of the 1 Corinthians 15:52-2 Corinthians 1:15; 10:13-12:5 on two parchment leaves (26 cm by 21 cm). The text is written in two columns per page, 38 lines per page, in small uncial letters, in red ink. It has errors of iota adscriptum (τηι for τῃ).

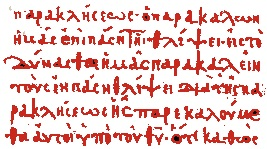
2 Cor 1:3-5 (Scrivener's facsimile)

The Greek text of this codex is a mixture of text-types. Aland placed it in Category III.

In 1 Corinthians 15:54 it lacks το φθαρτον τουτο ενδυσηται αφθαρσιαν και along with 088, 0243, 1175, 1739;

In 2 Corinthians 1:10 it reads τηλικουτου θανατου; the reading is supported by א, A, B, C, D^{gr}, G^{gr}, K, P, Ψ, 0209, 0243, 33, 81, 88, 104, 181, 326, 330, 436, 451, 614, 1241, 1739, 1877, 1881, 1962, 1984, 1985, 2127, 2492, 2495, Byz.

== History ==
Currently it is dated by the INTF to the 10th-century.

The manuscript was examined by Johann Jakob Griesbach. Griesbach was the first who observed similarities between Londoner fragment (0121a) and Hamburger fragment (0121b), and supposed that they came from the same manuscript.

The codex is located in the British Library (Harley MS 5613), in London. It was classified with Uncial 0121b as the same manuscript, but it is now established that they belonged to different manuscripts.

== See also ==
- List of New Testament uncials
- Textual criticism
- Minuscule 385
