= Family 1739 =

Family 1739 is a group of the New Testament manuscripts. The textual relation of this family to the main text-types, as Alexandrian, Western, and Byzantine, is still unclear. According to some scholars it represents the same text-type as the Caesarean text-type. Caesarean text is represented in the Gospels, and Family 1739 text in the rest of the books of the New Testament (except Apocalypse).

== Description ==
This textual family was discovered after the codex 1739 and it includes the manuscripts 323, 630, 945, 1739, 1881 (in the Acts of the Apostles) and 2200. In the Pauline epistles, to this family belong the manuscripts 0121a, 0243/0121b, 6, 424, 630 (in part) and 1881.

The family was discovered after study of minuscule 1739, when attention of scholars was focused upon a number of other manuscripts (minuscules 6, 424, 1908, two uncial fragments formerly classified as parts of one manuscripts – 0121) whose peculiarities were observed before but not understood. In minuscule 424 it was a series of interlinear corrections. Eduard Freiherr von der Goltz, discoverer and first collator of 1739, and Otto Bauernfeind, observed textual relationship of these manuscripts to 1739. Bauernfeind confirmed also Origenian links of the text of Epistle to the Romans in minuscule 1739.

The family derives from an archetype of about the 5th or 6th century and was the product of scholarly activity, probably in the library of Caesarea.

According to G. Zuntz, the Pauline epistles of the family 1739 represent the Caesarean text-type. He found frequent agreement between Origen and 1739 (outside part of Romans), both agree with p^{46} against the lesser Alexandrians. According to C.-B. Amfhoux and B. Outtier (1884) the Catholic epistles of the family 1739 represent the Caesarean text-type, especially in the variants they share with Codex Ephraemi, Papyrus 72, and the Old Georgian version.

=== Textual features ===
In Acts 8:37 it reads ειπε[ν] δε αυτω ει πιστευεις εξ ολης της καρδιας σου [323 omits σου] εξεστιν αποκριθεις δε ειπεν πιστευω τον υιον του θεου ειναι ιησουν χριστον (and he said to him, "If you believe with all [your] heart, it is allowed." He then responded, "I believe the Son of God is Jesus Christ.")

In 1 Corinthians 12:3 reads ουδεις εν πνευματι λαλων λεγει αναθεμα Ιησους και ουδεις δυναται ειπειν Κυριος Ιησους ει μη εν πνευματι αγιω (no one speaking by the Spirit [of God] ever says "Jesus be cursed!" and no one can say "Jesus is Lord" except by the Holy Spirit); in other textual traditions we find the object phrases in the accusative case Ιησουν, Κυριον Ιησουν; αναθεμα Ιησους is found in Origen comments.

In 1 Corinthians 15:54 it lacks το φθαρτον τουτο ενδυσηται αφθαρσιαν και;

In 1 Corinthians 16:6 παραμενω καταμενω;

In 2 Corinthians 11:23 it has reading φυλακαις περισσοτερος, εν πληγαις υπερβαλλοντως, majority has this phase in the following sequence of words: 4 5 3 1 2;

Old Georgian and Nubian version has some readings of the family 1739.

== See also ==
- Family Π
- Family E
- Family 1424
