= Minuscule 630 =

- New Testament manuscript
- Name: Ottobonianus gr. 325
- Text: Acts of the Apostles, Catholic epistles, and Pauline epistles
- Date: 12th/13th century
- Script: Greek
- Now at: Vatican Library
- Size: 19.3 cm by 12.6 cm
- Type: mixed
- Category: III

Minuscule 630 (in the Gregory-Aland numbering), α 461 (von Soden), is a Greek minuscule manuscript of the New Testament, on paper. It is known as Codex Ottobonianus. Palaeographically it has been assigned to the 12th or 13th century. The manuscript is lacunose. Formerly it was labeled by 163^{a} and 201^{p}.

== Description ==
The codex contains the text of the Acts of the Apostles, Catholic epistles, and Pauline epistles, on 215 paper leaves (size 19.3 cm by 12.6 cm), with lacunae (Acts 4:19-5:1). The text is written in one column per page, 26 lines per page. It contains Prolegomena, tables of the κεφαλαια (tables of contents) before each book, and subscriptions at the end of each book.

The order of books: Acts of the Apostles, Catholic epistles, and Pauline epistles. Epistle to the Hebrews is placed after Epistle to Philemon.

== Text ==
The Greek text of the codex is a mixture of the text-types. Kurt Aland placed it in Category III. Aland gave for it the following textual profile: Acts 45^{1} 24^{1/2} 18^{2} 10^{S}; Cath 47^{1} 7^{1/2} 35^{2} 14^{S}; Paul 171^{1} 44^{1/2} 28^{2} 10^{S}.

Textual variants

In Acts 16:10 it reads θεος along with P^{74}, Sinaiticus, Alexandrinus, Vaticanus, Ephraemi, E, 044, 33, 81, 181, 326, 945, 1739, ar, e, l, vg, cop^{bo}, geo; other reading κυριος, is supported by D, P, 049, 056, 0142, 88, 104, 330, 436, 451, 614, 629, 1241, 1505, 1877, 2127, 2412, 2492, 2495, Byz, c, d, gig, syr^{p,h}, cop^{sa}.

In Romans 8:1 it reads Ιησου κατα σαρκα περιπατουσιν αλλα κατα πνευμα, for Ιησου. The reading of the manuscript is supported by א^{c}, D^{c}, K, P, 33, 88, 104, 181, 326, 330, (436 omit μη), 456, 614, 1241, 1877, 1962, 1984, 1985, 2492, 2495, Byz, Lect.

In 1 Corinthians 7:5 it reads τη προσευχη (prayer) along with 𝔓^{11}, 𝔓^{46}, א*, A, B, C, D, F, G, P, Ψ, 6, 33, 81, 104, 181, 629, 1739, 1877, 1881, 1962, it, vg, cop, arm, eth. Other manuscripts read τη νηστεια και τη προσευχη (fasting and prayer) or τη προσευχη και νηστεια (prayer and fasting).

In 1 Corinthians 15:47 it has singular reading δευτερος ο κυριος for δευτερος ανθρωπος (א*, B, C, D, F, G, 0243, 33, 1739, it, vg, cop^{bo} eth) or δευτερος ανθρωπος ο κυριος (א^{c}, A, D^{c}, K, P, Ψ, 81, 104, 181, 326, 330, 436, 451, 614, 629, 1241, 1739^{mg}, 1877, 1881, 1984, 1985, 2127, 2492, 2495, Byz, Lect).

In 2 Corinthians 2:10 it reads τηλικουτων θανατων, along with p^{46}, 1739^{c}, it^{d,e}, syr^{p,h}, goth; other manuscripts read τηλικουτου θανατου or τηλικουτου κινδυνου.

In 2 Corinthians 11:14 it has reading ου θαυμα as codices Sinaiticus, Vaticanus, Bezae, Augiensis, Boernerianus, Porphyrianus, 098, Uncial 0243, Minuscule 6, 33, 81, 326, 365, 1175, 1739, 1881, 2464; the majority has reading ου θαυμαστον (D^{2}, Ψ, 0121a, Byz).

In 1 Timothy 3:16 it has textual variant θεός ἐφανερώθη (God manifested) (Sinaiticus^{e}, A^{2}, C^{2}, D^{c}, K, L, P, Ψ, 81, 104, 181, 326, 330, 436, 451, 614, 629, 1241, 1739, 1877, 1881, 1962, 1984, 1985, 2492, 2495, Byz, Lect), against ὃς ἐφανερώθη (he was manifested) supported by Sinaiticus, Codex Alexandrinus, Ephraemi, Boernerianus, 33, 365, 442, 2127, ℓ 599.

In Hebrews 8:11 it reads πλησιον for πολιτην — P, 81, 104, 436, 629, and 1985.

== History ==
F. H. A. Scrivener and C. R. Gregory dated the manuscript to the 14th century. Actually it is dated by the INTF to the 12th or 13th century.

The manuscript was added to the list of New Testament manuscripts by Johann Martin Augustin Scholz, who slightly examined a major part of the manuscript. It was examined and described by Giuseppe Cozza-Luzi. C. R. Gregory saw the manuscript in 1886.

Formerly it was labeled by 163^{a} and 201^{p}. In 1908 Gregory gave the number 630 to it.

It was examined and described by Ernesto Feron and Fabiano Battaglini.

The manuscript is cited by critical editions of the Greek New Testament: NA26, NA27, and UBS3.

The manuscript currently is housed at the Vatican Library (Ottob. gr. 325), at Rome.

== See also ==
- List of New Testament minuscules
- Biblical manuscript
- Textual criticism
- Family 1739
