= Minuscule 614 =

- New Testament manuscript
- Text: Acts of the Apostles, Catholic epistles, Pauline epistles †
- Date: 13th century
- Script: Greek
- Now at: Biblioteca Ambrosiana
- Size: 25.6 cm by 18.8 cm
- Type: Western / Byzantine
- Category: III/V
- Hand: clear large hand

Minuscule 614 (in the Gregory-Aland numbering), α ^{364} (von Soden), is a Greek minuscule manuscript of the New Testament, on parchment. Palaeographically it has been assigned to the 13th century. The manuscript is lacunose. Tischendorf labelled it by 137^{a} and 176^{p}.

According to some scholars, it is one of very few witnesses of the Western text-type with complete text of the Book of Acts. But Robert Waltz categorizes it with the Harklean Family (Family 2138) in a subgroup with its close relative Minuscule 2412. The earliest representative of this family is the marginal readings of the seventh-century Harklean Syriac version.

== Description ==
The codex contains the text of the Acts of the Apostles, Catholic epistles, and Pauline epistles on 276 parchment leaves (size 25.6 cm by 18.8 cm), with only one lacuna (Jude 3-25). The text is written in one column per page, 23 lines per page.

It contains prolegomena, lectionary markings at the margin, incipits, anagnoseis (lessons), subscriptions at the end, and stichoi. Synaxarion, Menologion, and liturgical notes were added by a later hand.

It contains additional material Journeys and death of Paul (as 102, 206, 216, 256, 468, 665, 912), it was added by a later hand.

The order of books: Acts, Pauline epistles, and Catholic epistles. Hebrews is placed after Epistle to Philemon.

The text of Romans 16:25-27 is following 14:23, as in Codex Angelicus Codex Athous Lavrensis, 0209, Minuscule 181 326 330 451 460 1241 1877 1881 1984 1985 2492 2495, and most other manuscripts.

== Text ==
The Greek text of the codex has been described as a representative of the Western text-type. Aland placed it in Category III. It is a sister manuscript to Minuscule 2412; they share slight variations of the Harklean marginal addition to Acts 18:21, καὶ ἀνήχθη ἀπὸ τῆς Ἐφέσου, τὸν δὲ Ἀκύλαν εἴασεν ἐν Ἐφέσῳ (and he sailed from Ephesus, but left Aquila in Ephesus). In the Catholic epistles Aland placed it in Category V.

The same text is found at the margin of the Book of Acts in Harklean Syriac. It has some the Caesarean readings in the Catholic epistles. In Pauline epistles its text is almost pure the Byzantine text. Bruce M. Metzger noted: "It contains a large number of pre-Byzantine readings, many of them of the Western type of text."

Clark and Riddle, who collated and published text of 2412, speculated that 614 might even have been copied from 2412.

The text is similar to Codex Bezae and Codex Laudianus. It is important witness of the Western text in that parts of the Acts where these two manuscripts are mutilated, especially at the end, because they do not have ending parts (Codex Beae lacks Acts 22:29–28:31; Codex Laudianus – Acts 26:29–28:26). In Acts 27:5; 28:16.19 codex 614 is witness for unique textual variants, which these two codices formerly contained.

== Textual variants ==
=== In the Acts ===
Acts 15:23 — it has unique reading γραψαντης δια χειρος αυτων επιστολην και πεμψαντες περιεχουσαν ταδε (they wrote by their hands this letter that contains), it is not supported by other manuscripts.
Acts 27:5 — additional δι ημερων δεκαπεντε (by fifteen days ); this reading is supported by 2147;
Acts 27:15 — interpolation τω πλεοντι και συστειλαντες τα ιστια along with the codex 2147 syr^{h**}.
Acts 27:19 — at the end of the verse it has additional phrase εις την θαλασσαν (to the sea) along with the codex 2147, Old Latin versions, some Vulgate manuscripts, syr^{h**}, and Sahidic version.
Acts 27:30 — codex 614 has singulary omission, it lacks word προφασει (pretext).
Acts 27:35 — the verse ends with the addition of επιδιδους και ημιν (and giving [it] also to us)
Acts 28:16 — additional εξω της παρεμβολης (outside the camp) supported by 2147 and Old Latin manuscripts.
Acts 28:19 — additional και επικραζοντων αιρε τον εχθρον ημων supported only by 2147 and syr^{h**}.
Acts 28:30 — it has addition at the end of verse: Ιουδαιους τε και Ελληνας (Jews and Greks) along with codices 2147, Codex Gigas, some Vulgate manuscripts, syr^{h**}.

=== In rest of books ===
Romans 8:1 it reads Ιησου κατα σαρκα περιπατουσιν αλλα κατα πνευμα, for Ιησου. The reading of the manuscript is supported by א^{c}, D^{c}, K, P, 33, 88, 104, 181, 326, 330, (436 omit μη), 456, 630, 1241, 1877, 1962, 1984, 1985, 2492, 2495, Byz, Lect.

1 Timothy 3:16 it has textual variant θεός ἐφανερώθη (God manifested) (Sinaiticus^{e}, A^{2}, C^{2}, D^{c}, K, L, P, Ψ, 81, 104, 181, 326, 330, 436, 451, 614, 629, 630, 1241, 1739, 1877, 1881, 1962, 1984, 1985, 2492, 2495, Byz, Lect), against ὃς ἐφανερώθη (he was manifested) supported by Sinaiticus, Codex Alexandrinus, Ephraemi, Boernerianus, 33, 365, 442, 2127, ℓ 599.

2 Timothy 4:22 it reads Ιησους for κυριος along with manuscripts Codex Alexandrinus, 104, vgst.

1 John 5:6 — it has textual variant δι' ὕδατος καὶ αἵματος καὶ πνεύματος (through water and blood and spirit) along with the manuscripts: Codex Sinaiticus, Codex Alexandrinus, 104, 424^{c}, 1739^{c}, 2412, 2495, ℓ 598^{m}, syr^{h}, cop^{sa}, cop^{bo}, Origen. Bart D. Ehrman identified this reading as Orthodox corrupt reading.

== History ==
Nothing is known of the manuscript's early history. The place of its origin is also unknown. It was bought at Corfu and came to Milan.

The manuscript was added to the list of New Testament manuscripts by Johann Martin Augustin Scholz. C. R. Gregory saw the manuscript in 1886.

Formerly it was labelled it by 137^{a} and 176^{p}. In 1908 Gregory gave the number 614 to it.

The manuscript was included to a critical apparatus by Kurt Aland in his 25th edition of Novum Testamentum Graece (1963).

The manuscript currently is housed at the Biblioteca Ambrosiana (E. 97 sup.), at Milan.

== See also ==
- List of New Testament minuscules
- Biblical manuscript
- Textual criticism
