= Uncial 088 =

- New Testament manuscript
- Text: 1 Cor 15:53-16:9; Tit 1:1-13
- Date: 5th/6th century
- Script: Greek
- Now at: Russian National Library
- Size: 23.5 x 20 cm
- Type: Alexandrian text-type
- Category: II

Uncial 088 (in the Gregory-Aland numbering), α 1021 (Soden), is a Greek uncial manuscript of the New Testament, dated paleographically to the 5th or 6th century.

== Description ==
To the present day survived only two parchment leaves of this codex (23.5 cm by 20 cm). The leaves are arranged in quarto in quire. They contain a small parts of the 1 Corinthians 15:53-16:9, and the Titus 1:1-13. The text is written in two columns per page, 24 lines per page, in very large uncial letters.

It is a palimpsest, the upper text is in Georgian from 10th century.

== Text ==
The Greek text of this codex is a representative of the Alexandrian text-type with some alien readings. Aland placed it in Category II.

In 1 Corinthians 15:52 it reads εγερθησονται (as p46, Sinaiticus, B C Ψ 075 0121a 0243 Byz); other manuscripts read αναστησονται (as A D F G P);

In 1 Corinthians 15:53 it has singular reading την αθανασιαν for αθανασιαν;

In 1 Corinthians 15:54 it lacks το φθαρτον τουτο ενδυσηται αφθαρσιαν και along with 0121a, 0243, 1175, 1739;

In 1 Corinthians 16:2 it has reading σαββατου (A, B, C, D, F, G, P, Ψ, 33) against σαββατων (075, 0121a, 0243, and Byzantine manuscripts);

== History ==
Currently it is dated by the INTF to the 5th or 6th century.

The text of the manuscript was edited by Constantin von Tischendorf. It was examined and described by Kurt Treu.

The codex currently is located at the Russian National Library (Gr. 6, II, fol. 5-6) at Saint Petersburg.

== See also ==
- List of New Testament uncials
- Biblical manuscript
- Textual criticism
