= Uncial 0151 =

- New Testament manuscript
- Text: Pauline epistles †
- Date: 9th century
- Script: Greek
- Now at: Monastery of Saint John the Theologian
- Size: 34 x 25 cm
- Type: Byzantine text-type
- Category: V
- Note: close to Codex Mosquensis I

Uncial 0151 (in the Gregory-Aland numbering), X^{21} (in the Soden numbering), is a Greek uncial manuscript of the New Testament. It is dated paleographically to the 9th century.

== Description ==
The codex contains the Pauline epistles with some gaps (lacunae), on 192 parchment leaves (34 cm by 25 cm). The text is written in two columns per page, 33 lines per page, in large uncial letters. It contains a commentary.

Epistle to the Hebrews is placed between 2 Thessalonians and 1 Timothy.

The Greek text of this codex is a representative of the Byzantine text-type. Aland placed it in Category V.

Textually it is close to Codex Mosquensis I.

C. R. Gregory dated it to the 12th century. Currently it is dated by the INTF to the 9th century.

Formerly it was classified as minuscule 414^{p}. In 1908 Gregory gave number 151 to it.

The codex currently is located at the Monastery of Saint John the Theologian (Ms. 62), at Patmos.

== See also ==
- List of New Testament uncials
- Textual criticism
