= Codex Petropolitanus =

Codex Petropolitanus is the Latin for Saint Petersburg Codex and may refer to one of the following manuscripts preserved in the Russian National Library, St. Petersburg:

- Codex Petropolitanus Purpureus N (022), New Testament manuscript from the 6th century, written in uncial (majuscule) script with silver ink on purple parchment. Other leaves are held by the British Library in London, the Byzantine museum in Thessaloniki, the Vatican, Lerma/Alessandria in Italy, Patmos, and the Pierpont Morgan Library in New York City.
- Codex Petropolitanus (New Testament) Π (041), New Testament manuscript from the 9th century, written in uncial (majuscule) script on parchment.
- Codex Leningradensis (Leningrad Codex), the oldest extant complete Tanakh (Old Testament) manuscript; registered as Hebrew manuscript Firkovich B19A.
- A manuscript of Tertullian, Apologeticus from the 8th–9th century is sometimes referred to a Codex Petropolitanus Latinus Q.v.I.40. It is on 61 folios of parchment, originating in the Abbey of Corbie.
