= Minuscule 629 =

Latin–Greek manuscript of the New Testament

- New Testament manuscript
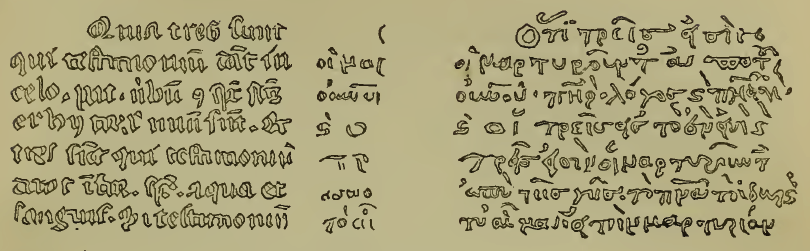
- Comma Johanneum; Horne's facsimile edition
- Name: Codex Ottobonianus graecus 298
- Text: New Testament (except Gospels and Revelation) †
- Date: 14th century
- Script: Latin–Greek
- Now at: Vatican Library
- Size: 17.1 cm by 12.1 cm
- Type: Vulgate text / Byzantine text-type, other
- Category: III

Minuscule 629 (in the Gregory-Aland numbering), α 460 (von Soden), is a Latin–Greek diglot minuscule manuscript of the New Testament, on parchment. It is known as Codex Ottobonianus. Palaeographically it has been assigned to the 14th century. The manuscript is lacunose. It is known for the Comma Johanneum.

Formerly it was labeled by 162^{a} and 200^{p}. Currently it is designated by the number 629.

== Description ==
The codex contains the text of the Acts of the Apostles, General epistles, and Pauline epistles, on 265 parchment leaves (size 17.1 cm by 12.1 cm), with lacunae at the beginning and end (Acts 1:1-2:27; Revelation 18:22-22:21). The text is written in two columns per page, 27 lines per page. The Latin text is alongside the Greek, the Greek column on the right.

The Latin column contains Prolegomena at the beginning and subscriptions at the end of each sacred book. The words are moved very often or put in Latin order; even division of the lines and syllables follow the Latin order.

The order of books is Acts of the Apostles, General epistles, and Pauline epistles. Epistle to the Hebrews is placed after Epistle to Philemon.

== Text ==
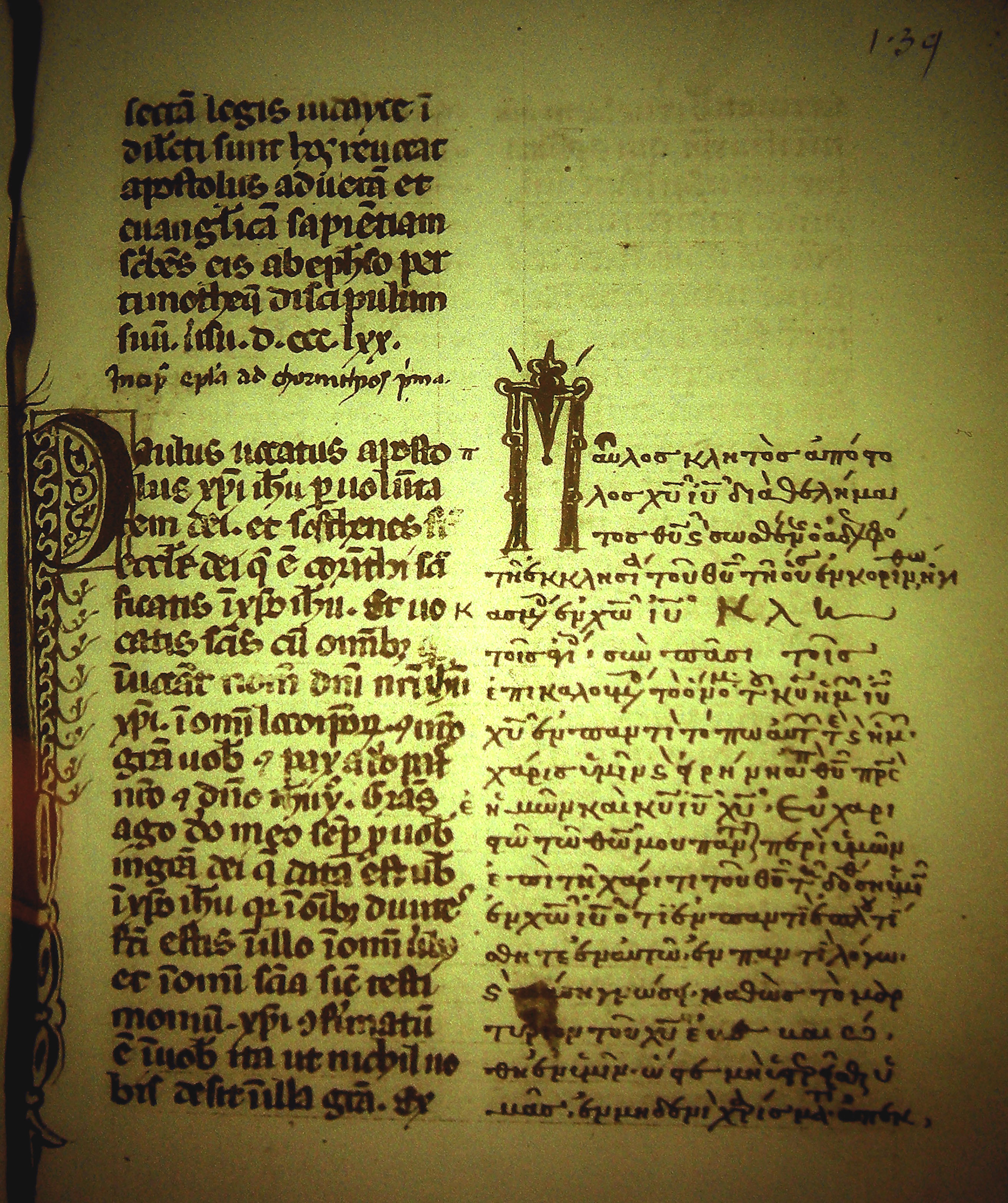
The beginning of 1. Corinthians: Courtesy of: www.Biblical-data.org

The Greek text of the codex has been revised according to the Vulgate. The Greek text is made to conform to the Vulgate Latin text, but the assimilation is far from complete. It has some Western elements in the Pauline epistles.

Kurt and Barbara Aland placed the Greek text of the codex in Category III. In the General epistles it has the number of singular readings. It has some unusual readings added by a later hand.

It has a unique reading of Acts 8:37, specifically mentioning the eunuch.

In Romans 8:1 it reads Ιησου κατα σαρκα περιπατουσιν, for Ιησου (as א, B, D, G, 1739, 1881, it^{d, g}, cop^{sa, bo}, eth). The reading of the manuscript is supported by A, D^{b}, Ψ, 81, 2127, vg. The Byzantine manuscripts read Ιησου μη κατα σαρκα περιπατουσιν αλλα κατα πνευμα.

In 1 Corinthians 7:5 it reads τη προσευχη (prayer) along with 𝔓^{11}, 𝔓^{46}, א*, A, B, C, D, F, G, P, Ψ, 6, 33, 81, 104, 181, 630, 1739, 1877, 1881, 1962, it, vg, cop, arm, eth. Other manuscripts read τη νηστεια και τη προσευχη (fasting and prayer) or τη προσευχη και νηστεια (prayer and fasting).

In 1 Corinthians 7:14 it reads ανδρι τω πιστω for αδελφω. The reading is supported only by Old Latin manuscripts (ar, c, dem, t, x, z) and Peshitta.

It has singular reading in 2 Corinthians 2:10 – τηλικουτου κινδυνου; other manuscripts read τηλικουτου θανατου or τηλικουτων θανατων.

In 1 Timothy 3:16 it has textual variant θεός ἐφανερώθη (God manifested) (Sinaiticus^{e}, A^{2}, C^{2}, D^{c}, K, L, P, Ψ, 81, 104, 181, 326, 330, 436, 451, 614, 630, 1241, 1739, 1877, 1881, 1962, 1984, 1985, 2492, 2495, Byz, Lect), against ὃς ἐφανερώθη (he was manifested) supported by Sinaiticus, Codex Alexandrinus, Ephraemi, Boernerianus, 33, 365, 442, 2127, ℓ 599.

In Hebrews 8:11 it reads πλησιον for πολιτην — P, 81, 104, 436, 630, and 1985.

It contains a unique reading of the Comma Johanneum written in prima manu.

Comma Johanneum
Quia tres sunt qui testimonium dant in celo, pater, verbum, et spiritus sanctus, et hi tres unum sunt. Et tres sunt qui testimonium dant in terra, spiritus, aqua et sanguis. Si testimonium	Ὃτι τρεῖς εἰσιν οἱ μαρτυροῦντες ἀπὸ τοῦ οὐρανοῦ, Πατὴρ, Λόγος καὶ Πνεῦμα ἅγιον καὶ οἱ τρεῖς εἰς τὸ ἕν εἰσι καὶ τρεῖς εἰσὶν οἱ μαρτυροῦντες ἐπὶ τῆς γῆς τὸ Πνεῦμα τὸ ὕδωρ καὶ τὸ αἷμα, εἰ τὴν μαρτυρίαν.

== History ==
Scrivener dated the manuscript to the 15th century, Gregory and Aland to the 14th century. However, the Institute for New Testament Textual Research dates it to the 14th century.

The manuscript was added to the list of New Testament manuscripts by Johann Martin Augustin Scholz, who examined a major part of the manuscript. It was examined by Henry Alford. A facsimile of the passage 1 John 5:7-8 (Comma Johanneum) was traced in 1829 by Cardinal Wiseman for Bishop Burgess, and published by Horne in several editions of his Introduction, as also by Tregelles. It was examined and described by Giuseppe Cozza-Luzi. C. R. Gregory saw the manuscript in 1886.

Formerly it was labeled by 162^{a} and 200^{p}. In 1908 Gregory gave the number 629 to it.

It was examined and described by Ernesto Feron and Fabiano Battaglini.

The manuscript was cited in the 26th and 27th edition of the Novum Testamentum Graece of Nestle-Aland.

The manuscript currently is housed at the Vatican Library (Ottobonianus graecus 298), in Rome.

== See also ==
- List of New Testament minuscules
- Biblical manuscript
- Textual criticism
