= Minuscule 330 =

12th century Greek manuscript of the New Testament

- New Testament manuscript
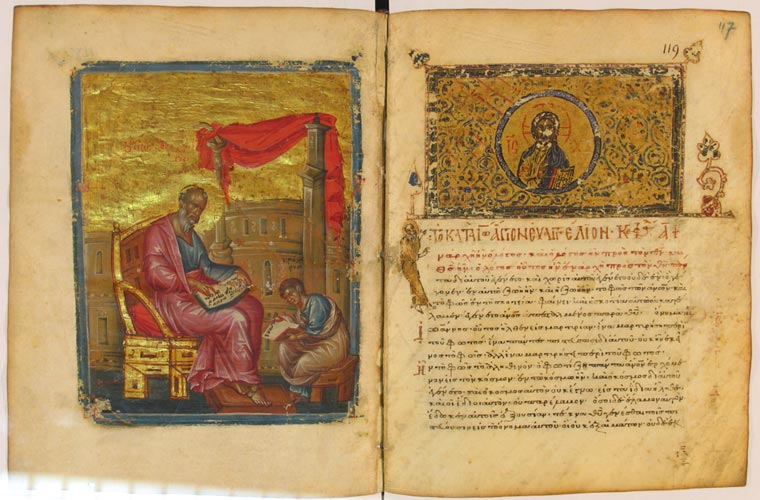
- Folios 116v-117r of the codex; John the Evangelist on folio 116v and the first page of the Gospel of John, with the decorated headpiece
- Text: New Testament (except Rev.)
- Date: 12th century
- Script: Greek
- Now at: National Library of Russia
- Size: 24 cm by 18.6 cm
- Type: Byzantine text-type
- Category: V, III
- Note: close to the codex 451

Minuscule 330 is a Greek minuscule manuscript of the New Testament, made of parchment. It is designated by the siglum 330 in the Gregory-Aland numbering of New Testament manuscripts, and δ 259 in the von Soden numbering of New Testmanet manuscripts. Using the study of comparative writing styles (palaeography), it has been assigned to the 12th century. It has marginal notes.

== Description ==
The manuscript is a codex (precursor to the modern book format), containing the text of the New Testament, except the Book of Revelation, written on 287 parchment leaves (sized 24 cm by 18.6 cm) with some gaps. The text is written in one column per page, the biblical text in 30 lines per page. The text is divided according to the chapters (known as κεφαλαια / kephalaia), whose numbers are given in the margin, and their titles (known as τιτλοι / titloi) written at the top of the pages. There is also a division according to the Ammonian Sections, with references to the Eusebian Canons (written below Ammonian Section numbers).

There are three ornamental initials and four ornamental head-pieces (leaves 11, 51, 77, 117). It contains 10 pictures, four of them being portraits of the Evangelists (folios 10v, 76v, 116v, 116v). The portrait of John the Evangelist has the pupil St Prokhor with him. The head-piece to the Gospel of John contains an incorporated medallion bearing a half-length image of Jesus Christ. The initial letter (epsilon) at the beginning of John contains a figure of John the Evangelist.

The nomina sacra (contractions of names/titles considered sacred in Christianity) are included, and the errors of itacism (confusion of like-sounding letters and diphthongs) are frequent. It contains the Epistle to Carpius, Prolegomena of Cosmas, the Eusebian Canon tables with ornamental frames, table of contents (also known as κεφαλαια) before each Gospel, a Synaxarion, a Menologion, subscriptions at the end of each Gospels, and the Euthalian Apparatus to the Pauline epistles.

The order of books is as follows:

- Gospels
- Acts of the Apostles
- Catholic epistles
- Pauline epistles

This is unusual, as the Pauline epistles usually precede the Catholic epistles.

== Text ==
Except in the Pauline epistles, the Greek text of the codex is considered to be a representative of the Byzantine text-type. Biblical scholar Hermann von Soden classified it to the textual family K^{x}. Except for the Pauline epistles, biblical scholar Kurt Aland placed it in Category V of his New Testament classification system. The text of the Pauline epistles is placed in Category III. Category III manuscripts are described as having "a small but not a negligible proportion of early readings, with a considerable encroachment of [Byzantine] readings, and significant readings from other sources as yet unidentified." Category V manuscripts are described as "manuscripts with a purely or predominantly Byzantine text." According to the Claremont Profile Method (a specific analysis of textual data), it represents textual group 16 in Luke 1, Luke 10, and Luke 20.

The text of the Gospels is close to that seen in the minuscule manuscripts 16, 119, 217, 491, 578, 693, 1528, and 1588. The text of the Pauline epistles is very close to that seen in the minuscules 451, 2400, and 2492.

Some Textual variants

Acts 18:26

την οδον (the way) - 𝔓^{74} א A B 33 614 1175 vg
την του θεου οδον (the way of God) - 330 P Ψ 049 0142 104 451 1241 1877 2127 2492 Byz Lect.

Romans 8:1

Ιησου μη κατα σαρκα περιπατουσιν αλλα κατα πνευμα (of Jesus, who do not live according to [the] flesh, but according to [the] Spirit) - 330 א^{c} D^{c} K P 33 88 104 181 326 456 614 630 1241 1877 1962 1984 1985 2492 2495 Byz Lect
Ιησου (of Jesus) - א* B D* F G 6. 1506. 1739. 1881 b m co; Ambst.

Romans 15:19

πνευματος θεου αγιου (of the Holy Spirit of God) - 330 451
πνευματος θεου (of the Spirit of God) - Majority of Manuscripts.

Romans 16:25–27

follows 14:23 - 330 L Ψ 0209 181 326 451 460 614 1241 1877 1881 1984 1985 2492 2495
follows 16:24 - Majority of Manuscripts.

1 Corinthians 2:1

μαρτυριον (witness) - 330 B D G P Ψ 33 81 104 181 326 451 614 629 630 1241 1739 1877 1881 1962 1984 2127 2492 2495 Byz Lect it vg syr^{h}

cop^{sa} arm eth.

μυστηριον (mystery) - Majority of Manuscripts.

1 Corinthians 2:14

πνευματος (of the Spirit) - 330 2 216 255 440 451 823 1827 syr^{p}
πνευματος του θεου (of the Spirit of God) - Majority of Manuscripts.

1 Corinthians 7:5

τη προσευχη και νηστεια (prayer and fasting) - 330 451 JoDam
τη νηστεια και τη προσευχη (fasting and prayer) - Majority of Manuscripts.

Colossians 4:8

γνω τα περι ημων (may know the matters concerning you) - 330 451 ℓ 598 ℓ 1356
γνω τα περι ὑμων (may know the matters concerning us) - Majority of Manuscripts.

1 Timothy 3:16

θεός ἐφανερώθη (God manifested) - 330 א^{e} A^{2} C^{2} D^{c} K L P Ψ 81 104 181 326 436 451 614 629 630 1241 1739 1877 1881 1962 1984 1985 2492 2495 Byz Lect
ὃς ἐφανερώθη (he was manifested) - א* A* C G 33 365 442 2127 ℓ 599

2 Timothy 4:22

η χαρις μεθ υμων. αμην (Grace be with you. Amen)

omit. - 330 sa^{mss}
incl. - Majority of Manuscripts.

2 John 1:1

῾Ο πρεσβύτερος ἐκλεκτῇ τῇ κυρίᾳ (The elder to the Lady Eclecta) - 330 69 1243 2492
῾Ο πρεσβύτερος ἐκλεκτῇ κυρίᾳ (The elder to the chosen Lady) - Majority of Manuscripts.

== History ==
The earliest history of the manuscript is unknown. Until the 1540s the manuscript was kept at the Great Lavra of St Athanasius on Mount Athos, then it belonged to Pierre Seguier (1588-1672), Chancellor of France. It was a part of the Fonds Coislin (Gr. 196). At the end of the 18th century Peter P. Dubrovsky (1754-1816), serving as the secretary to the Russian Embassy at Paris, acquired the manuscript. It was added to the list of New Testament manuscripts by textual critic Johann M. A. Scholz (1794-1852).

The manuscript was described by biblical scholar Bernard de Montfaucon. It was examined and described by scholar Paulin Martin,, and collated by Eduard de Muralt. A new collation was made by M. Davies. Restoration work of the manuscript was made in 1968, where the portraits of the four Evangelists were repainted.

Biblical scholar Frederick H. A. Scrivener dated the manuscript to the 11th century. Eduard de Muralt and biblical scholar Caspar René Gregory dated the manuscript to the 12th century. It is presently dated by the INTF to the 12th century. The manuscript is currently housed at the National Library of Russia (shelf number Gr. 101) in Saint Petersburg.

== See also ==
- Minuscule 331
- Minuscule 329
- List of New Testament minuscules
- Biblical manuscript
- Textual criticism
