= Uncial 0121b =

10th-century Greek uncial manuscript of the New Testament

- New Testament manuscript
- Name: Fragmentum Uffenbachianum
- Text: Hebrews 1-4; 12-13 †
- Date: 10th-century
- Script: Greek
- Now at: University of Hamburg
- Size: 26 cm by 21 cm
- Type: mixed
- Category: III

Uncial 0121b (in the Gregory-Aland numbering), it was named as Fragmentum Uffenbachianum, or Codex Ruber. It is a Greek uncial manuscript of the New Testament, dated palaeographically to the 10th-century. The manuscript is very lacunose.

== Description ==
The codex contains parts of Hebrews 1:1-4:3; 12:20-13:25 on two parchment leaves (26 cm by 21 cm). The text is written in two columns per page, 45 lines per page, in small semi-uncial letters, in red ink (hence Codex Ruber). The accents and notes of aspiration are carefully marked, but the iota subscriptum does not occur anywhere. The Iota adscriptum occurs three times, ν εφελκυστικον is rare. The interrogative (;) occurs once (Heb 3:7), and the inverted comma (>) is often repeated to mark quotations.

The letters are a little unusual, small in form, and their character is between uncial and minuscule, and in the 19th century the codex was classified as a minuscule manuscript (catalogue number 53). Tregelles argued that they are more uncial by character, they are almost entirely separate, and sometimes joined in the same word. "They are certainly by no means cursive, in the common acceptation of the term". According to Scrivener they "can hardly be called semicursive". According to Günther Zuntz it is an uncial manuscript, its letters are that kind of uncial script, which scribes of the 10th and later centuries used.

The size is the same as in Uncial 0121a, the number of lines is almost the same, and characters of letters are similar, therefore they were originally described and classified as the same manuscript (f.e. F. H. A. Scrivener). They received catalogue number 0121 in the Gregory-Aland system. Now after more accurate examination, they are unanimously considered to belong to different manuscripts.

== Text ==
The Greek text of this codex is a representative of the mixed text-type. Aland placed it in Category III.

It does not contain Hebrews verse 2:1. The omission is supported by minuscules 1739 and 1881

In Hebrews 2:9 it reads χωρὶς θεοῦ (apart from God) for χάριτι θεοῦ (by the grace of God). The reading of the codex is supported by 424^{c}, 1739, mss, Peshitta, Origen, Theodore of Mopsuestia, St. Ambrose of Milan, St. Jerome, Fulgentius, Theodoret.

== History ==
Currently it is dated by the INTF to the 10th-century.

The manuscript came from Italy. It once belonged to H. van der Merk. In 1712 it was in The Hague.

The manuscript once belonged to Conrad von Uffenbach (hence the name Fragmentum Uffenbachianum), then to J. C. Wolf, and after his death in 1739 to the Public Library of Hamburg. It was very imperfectly described by Maius, Wettstein, Griesbach, and Bengel. Tregelles collated its text twice. Constantin von Tischendorf edited its text in 1855 (with 5 errors) and in 1861 corrected these 5 errors.

The codex now is located in the University of Hamburg (Cod. 50), in Hamburg.

== See also ==
- List of New Testament uncials
- Textual criticism
- Uncial 0243
