= Minuscule 451 =

- New Testament manuscript
- Text: Acts, Catholic epistles, Pauline epistles
- Date: 11th century
- Script: Greek
- Now at: Vatican Library
- Size: 19.2 cm by 13.9 cm
- Type: mixed, Byzantine
- Category: III, V

Minuscule 451 (in the Gregory-Aland numbering), α 178 (in the Soden numbering), is a Greek minuscule manuscript of the New Testament, on parchment. Palaeographically it has been assigned to the 11th century. Formerly it was labelled by 79^{a} and 90^{p}. The manuscript has not survived in complete condition.

== Description ==
The codex is written on 161 parchment leaves in minuscule script. Some of leaves were lost. The leaves are measured 19.2 cm by 13.9 cm.

It contains the text of the Acts of the Apostles, Catholic epistles, and Pauline epistles, with two lacunae (2 Cor 11:15-12:1; Eph 1:9-Heb 13:25). The order of books: Acts, Catholic epistles, Pauline epistles. It contains also liturgical books with hagiographies: Synaxarion and Menologion.

The biblical text is written in one column per page, in 30 lines per page. The letters are written above lines.

It contains Prolegomena at the beginning, lectionary markings at the margin (for liturgical use), the Euthalian Apparatus, and numbers of στιχοι in subscriptions.

== Text ==
The Greek text of the codex is mixed in the Pauline epistles, elsewhere the Byzantine text-type. Aland placed it in Category III in Pauline epistles and in Category V elsewhere. Textually it is very close to the codices 330, 2400, 2492.

Some unique readings of the codex

Acts 13:33

- εν τω ψαλμω τω δευτερω γεγραπται (it is written in the second Psalm) – Ε Π 049 88 104 330 436 614 629 1241 1505 1877 2127 2412 2492 2495 Byz;

Acts 18:26

- την του θεου οδον along with P, Ψ, 049, 0142, 104, 330, 1241, 1877, 2127, 2492, Byz, Lect;

Romans 4:11

- λογισθηναι αυτον — 451;
- λογισθηναι και — א* A B 81 330 630 1739 1881 Byz;
- λογισθηναι — 2492

Romans 15:19 it supports πνευματος θεου αγιου along with Minuscule 330

πνευματος θεου
πνευματος αγιου;

Romans 16:25-27 is following 14:23, as in Codex Angelicus Codex Athous Lavrensis, 0209, Minuscule 181 326 330 460 614 1241 1877 1881 1984 1985 2492 2495.

In 1 Corinthians 7:5 it has unique reading τη προσευχη και νηστεια (prayer and fasting); the reading is supported only by 451, and John of Damascus. Other readings:

τη προσευχη (prayer) – 𝔓^{11}, 𝔓^{46}, א*, A, B, C, D, G, P, Ψ, 33, 81, 104, 181, 629, 630, 1739, 1877, 1881, 1962, it vg, cop, arm, eth
τη νηστεια και τη προσευχη (fasting and prayer) – א^{c}, K, L, 88, 326, 436, 614, 1241, 1984, 1985, 2127, 2492, 2495, Byz, Lect, syr^{p,h}, goth.

In Ephesians 5:9 it reads πνευματος along with: P46 D^{c} Κ Ψ 88 104 181 326 436 614 630 1241 1739^{mg} 1877 1985 2495 Byz ℓ 809 syr^{h}; other manuscripts have φωτος — P49 א A B D* F G 33 81 330 1739* 1881 1962 cop^{sa} Lectionaries it vg syr^{p}, syr^{pal} cop^{sa, bo}.

== History ==
Gregory dated it to the 11th century, Stornajolo to the 12th century. Currently it is dated by the INTF to the 11th century>

The manuscript was examined by Birch, Scholz, Stornalojo, and C. R. Gregory (1886).

The manuscript was added to the list of the New Testament manuscripts by Scholz (1794-1852).

Formerly it was labelled by 79^{a} and 90^{p}. In 1908 Gregory gave the number 451 to it.

It is currently housed at the Vatican Library (Urb. gr. 3) in Rome.

== See also ==
- List of New Testament minuscules
- Biblical manuscript
- Textual criticism
