= Minuscule 365 =

- New Testament manuscript
- Text: New Testament (except Rev.)
- Date: 12th century
- Script: Greek
- Found: 1794
- Now at: Laurentian Library
- Size: 19 cm by 13.5 cm
- Type: mixed, Byzantine
- Category: III, V
- Note: marginalia

Minuscule 365 (in the Gregory-Aland numbering), δ 367 (Soden), is a Greek minuscule manuscript of the New Testament with some parts of the Old Testament, on parchment. Paleographically it has been assigned to the 12th century. It has marginalia.

== Description ==
The codex contains the text of the New Testament except Book of Revelation on 356 parchment leaves (19 cm by 13.5 cm) with lacunae. It is written in one column per page, in 33 lines per page.

The text is divided according to the κεφαλαια (chapters), whose numbers are given at the margin, and their τιτλοι (titles of chapters) at the top of the pages. There is also a division according to the Ammonian Sections (in Mark 234 sections, the last in 16:9), but without references to the Eusebian Canons.

It contains the Eusebian Canon tables, Verses, and pictures. The manuscript contains also the Psalms with Hymns.

== Text ==
The Greek text of the codex Aland assigned to Category III in the Pauline epistles, and to Category V elsewhere. It means it is a representative of the Byzantine text-type with exception for the Pauline epistles. According to the Claremont Profile Method it represents the textual family Π^{b} in Luke 1 and Luke 20. In Luke 10 no profile was made.

The ending of the Epistle to the Romans has the following order of verses: 16:23; 16:25-27; 16:24 (as in codices P 33 104 256 263 436 459 1319 1573 1852 arm).

In Romans 13:9 it has additional phrase ου ψευδομαρτυρησεις, the reading is supported by the manuscripts: א (P) 048 81 104 1506 a b vg^{cl} (syr^{h}) cop^{bo}

In 2 Corinthians 11:14 it has reading ου θαυμα as codices Sinaiticus, Vaticanus, Bezae, Augiensis, Boernerianus, Porphyrianus, 098, Uncial 0243, Minuscule 6, 33, 81, 326, 630, 1175, 1739, 1881, 2464; the majority has the reading ου θαυμαστον (D^{2}, Ψ, 0121a, Byz).

In Ephesians 1,7 it reads χρηστοτητος for χαριτος along with Codex Alexandrinus, several minuscules, and cop^{bo}.

In Tim 3:16 it has textual variant ὃς ἐφανερώθη (he was manifested), it is Alexandrian readings confirmed by the manuscripts Codex Sinaiticus, Codex Alexandrinus, Codex Ephraemi, Minuscule 33, Minuscule 442, Minuscule 2127, but it is also confirmed by the manuscripts of the Western text-type like Codex Augiensis and Codex Boernerianus.

== History ==
The manuscript was brought from Greece to Florence in 1794. The manuscript was added to the list of New Testament manuscripts by Scholz (1794-1852). It was examined by Burgon, Scholz collated it in select passages. M. Davies collated only the text of Galatians. C. R. Gregory saw it in 1886.

The manuscript is currently housed at the Biblioteca Laurentiana (Plutei VI. 36) in Florence.

== See also ==
- List of New Testament minuscules
- Biblical manuscript
- Textual criticism
