= Codex Mosquensis I =

Greek manuscript

Uncial 018
- New Testament manuscript
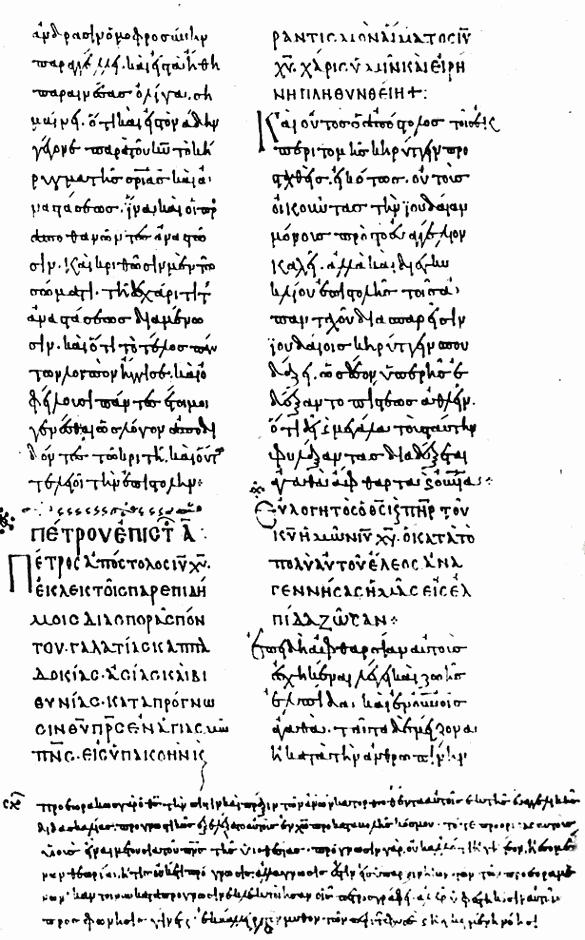
- Beginning of 1 Peter
- Name: Mosquensis I
- Sign: K^{ap}
- Text: Catholic epistles, Pauline epistles
- Date: 9th century
- Script: Greek
- Now at: State Historical Museum
- Size: 33.8 cm by 24.2 cm
- Type: Byzantine text-type
- Category: V
- Note: close to 0151

Codex Mosquensis I designated by K^{ap} or 018 (in the Gregory-Aland numbering), Α^{πρ1} (Soden), is a Greek uncial manuscript of New Testament, palaeographically it has been assigned to the 9th century. The manuscript is lacunose.

== Description ==
The manuscript contains an almost complete text of the Catholic and Pauline epistles, with the exception of two lacunae (Romans 10:18—1 Corinthians 6:13; 1 Corinthians 8:8-11). Formerly it also contained the Acts of the Apostles, which book has been lost.

The text is written on 288 parchment leaves (33.8 cm by 24.2 cm), in 2 columns per page, 27 lines per page, in uncial script, but separated into paragraphs by comments, written in minuscule script. There are some scholia at the foot of the pages attributed to John Chrysostom. It contains breathings and accents.

== Text ==
The Greek text of this codex is a representative of the Byzantine text-type. Kurt Aland placed it in Category V. Textually it is close to Uncial 0151.

In Romans 1:8 it has variant περι, along with the codices א A B C D* 33 81 1506 1739 1881, against υπερ — D^{c} G Ψ Byz.

In Romans 8:1 it reads Ιησου κατα σαρκα περιπατουσιν αλλα κατα πνευμα, for Ιησου. The reading of the manuscript is supported by א^{c}, D^{c}, P, 33, 88, 104, 181, 326, 330, (436 omit μη), 456, 614, 630, 1241, 1877, 1962, 1984, 1985, 2492, 2495, Byz, Lect.

In 1 Timothy 3:16 it has textual variant θεός ἐφανερώθη (God manifested) (Sinaiticus^{e}, A^{2}, C^{2}, D^{c}, K, L, P, Ψ, 81, 104, 181, 326, 330, 436, 451, 614, 629, 630, 1241, 1739, 1877, 1881, 1962, 1984, 1985, 2492, 2495, Byz, Lect), against ὃς ἐφανερώθη (he was manifested) supported by Sinaiticus, Codex Alexandrinus, Ephraemi, Boernerianus, 33, 365, 442, 2127, ℓ 599.

In 1 Peter 4:14, the manuscript contains the variant reading κατὰ μὲν αὐτοὺς βλασφημεῖται, κατὰ δὲ ὑμᾶς δοξάζεται ("according to them he is blasphemed, but according to you he is glorified") along with manuscripts L P Ψ 1448 1611, the Byzantine Codices, a majority or all of the Old Latin witnesses, the Wordsworth/White Vulgate Edition, the Greek-manuscript-consulted Harklensis Syriac Vorlage, Sahidic manuscripts, one Bohairic manuscript, and the church father Cyprian (3rd Century).

== History ==
The manuscript is dated by the INTF to the 9th century.

The manuscript came from the Dionysiou monastery at Athos to Moscow in 1655.

It was examined by Scholz and collated by Matthaei. Cited in all editions since Tischendorf's edition.

The codex came from Athos to Moscow, where is located now in the State Historical Museum (V. 93).

== See also ==
- List of New Testament uncials
- Biblical manuscripts
- Textual criticism
