= Minuscule 104 =

11th-century New Testament manuscript

- New Testament manuscript
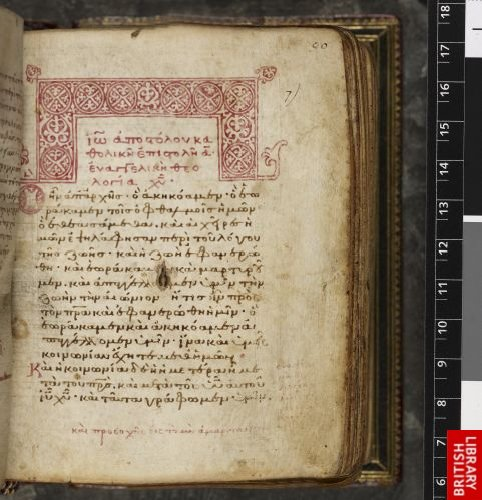
- First page from the First Epistle of John with decorated initial
- Text: Acts, Pauline epistles, Rev.
- Date: 1087
- Script: Greek
- Found: Asia Minor, John Covel
- Now at: British Library
- Size: 11.7 cm by 9.4 cm
- Type: Alexandrian / Byzantine
- Category: III/V

Minuscule 104 (in the Gregory-Aland numbering), α 103 (Soden), is a Greek minuscule manuscript of the New Testament, on parchment leaves. Palaeographically it has been assigned to the 11th century.

Formerly it was labelled by 25^{a}, 31^{p}, and 7^{r}. The manuscript is lacunose.

== Description ==
The codex contains almost complete text of the Acts, Pauline epistles, and the Book of Revelation on 286 parchment leaves (size 11.7 cm by 9.4 cm), with only one lacuna (1 John 5:14-2 John 5). The text is written in one column per page, in 23 lines per page.

According to the colophon it was written in 1087. The headpieces with geometric decorations. The initial letters in red.

It contains prolegomena, tables of the κεφάλαια (tables of contents) before each book, subscriptions at the end of each book, and numbers of στίχοι.

Ending of the Epistle to the Romans has the order of verses: 16:23; 16:25-27; 16:24 (as in codices P, 33, 256, 263, 365, 436, 459, 1319, 1573, 1852, arm).

== Text ==
The Greek text of the codex is an eclectic, in the Epistles it is a representative of the Alexandrian text-type and the Byzantine in the Acts and Apocalypse. Aland placed it in Category III in epistles, and in Category V in the Acts and Book of Revelation.

In Acts 12:25 it has unique reading εἰς Ἱερουσαλὴμ εἰς Ἀντιόχειαν (to Jerusalem to Antioch); the reading is supported by some manuscripts of cop^{sa}; majority reads εἰς Ἱερουσαλήμ (to Jerusalem) – א, B, H, L, P, 049, 056, 0142, 81, 88, 326, 330, 451, 629, 1241, 1505, 1877, 2492, 2495, Byz, Lect;

In Acts 18:26 it reads τὴν τοῦ θεοῦ ὁδόν along with P, Ψ, 049, 0142, 330, 451, 1241, 1877, 2127, 2492, Byz, Lect;

In Acts 20:15 it reads καὶ μείναντες ἐν Στογυλίῳ (056 and 0142 have Στρογγυλίῳ).

In Acts 27:16 it reads Κλαύδαν (neuter) for Κλαύδην (feminine), this reading is supported by Minuscule 88 and Lectionary 60.

In Acts 27:41 it reads ἀπὸ τῆς βίας τῶν κυμάτων along with א^{c};

In Romans 8:1 it reads Ἰησοῦ κατὰ σάρκα περιπατοῦσιν ἀλλὰ κατὰ πνεῦμα, for Ἰησοῦ. The reading of the manuscript is supported by א^{c}, D^{c}, K, P, 33, 88, 181, 326, 330, (436 omit μη), 456, 614, 630, 1241, 1877, 1962, 1984, 1985, 2492, 2495, Byz, Lect.

In Romans 13:9 it has additional phrase οὐ ψευδομαρτυρήσεις, the reading is supported by the manuscripts: א (P) 048 81 365 1506 a b vg^{cl} (syr^{h}) cop^{bo}

The ending of the Epistle to the Romans has an unusual order of verses: 16:23; 16:25-27; 16:24 (as in codices P 33 256 263 365 436 459 1319 1573 1837 1852 syr^{p} arm).

In 1 Corinthians 2:1 it reads μαρτύριον along with B D G P Ψ 33 81 181 326 330 451 614 629 630 1241 1739 1877 1881 1962 1984 2127 2492 2495 Byz Lect it vg syr^{h} cop^{sa} arm eth. Other manuscripts read μυστήριον or σωτήριον.

In 1 Corinthians 7:5 it reads τῇ προσευχῇ (prayer) along with 𝔓^{11}, 𝔓^{46}, א*, A, B, C, D, F, G, P, Ψ, 6, 33, 81, 181, 629, 630, 1739, 1877, 1881, 1962, it, vg, cop, arm, eth. Other manuscripts read τῇ νηστείᾳ καὶ τῇ προσευχῇ (fasting and prayer) or τῇ προσευχῇ καὶ νηστείᾳ (prayer and fasting).

In Galatians 3:21 it reads του Χριστου for του Θεου.

In 1 Thessalonians 2:7 it reads νήπιοι (babies), the corrector changed it into ἢπιοι (gentle).

In 1 Timothy 3:16 it has textual variant θεὸς ἐφανερώθη (God was manifested, appeared) (Sinaiticus^{e}, A^{2}, C^{2}, D^{c}, K, L, P, Ψ, 81, 181, 326, 330, 436, 451, 614, 629, 630, 1241, 1739, 1877, 1881, 1962, 1984, 1985, 2492, 2495, Byz, Lect), against ὃς ἐφανερώθη (who (rel.) was manifested, appeared) supported by Sinaiticus, Codex Alexandrinus, Ephraemi, Boernerianus, 33, 365, 442, 2127, ℓ 599.

In 2 Timothy 4:10 it reads Γαλλιαν, along with Sinaiticus C 81 326 436; other manuscript read Γαλατιαν (A D F G K L P Ψ 33 88 181 330 451 614 629 630 1241 1739 1877 1881 1962 1984 1985 2127 2492 2495 Byz Lect) or Γαλιλαιαν (cop^{bo}).

In 2 Timothy 4:22 it reads Ἰησοῦς for κύριος along with manuscripts Codex Alexandrinus, 614, vgst.

In Hebrews 8:11 it reads πλησιον for πολιτην — P, 81, 436, 629, 630, and 1985.

In 1 John 5:6 it has textual variant δι' ὕδατος καὶ αἵματος καὶ πνεύματος (through water and blood and spirit) together with the manuscripts: Codex Sinaiticus, Codex Alexandrinus 424^{c}, 614, 1739^{c}, 2412, 2495, ℓ 598^{m}, syr^{h}, cop^{sa}, cop^{bo}, Origen. Bart D. Ehrman identified this reading as Orthodox corrupt reading.

== History ==
The manuscript was written by a scribe named Ioannes Tzoutzounas and was held in Asia Minor. It was purchased by John Covel, chaplain of the Levant Company at Constantinople 1670-1676.

It was examined by Mill, Griesbach, Bloomfield, Henri Omont, and F. H. A. Scrivener.

Formerly it was labelled by 25^{a}, 31^{p}, and 7^{r}. In 1908 C. R. Gregory gave the number 104 to it.

It was cited in 27th edition of Nestle-Aland Novum Testamentum Graece only once (1 Cor 11:24).

It is currently housed at the British Library (Harley MS 5537).

== See also ==
- List of New Testament minuscules
- Biblical manuscript
- Textual criticism
