= Minuscule 436 =

- New Testament manuscript
- Text: Acts, Pauline epistles
- Date: 11th century
- Script: Greek
- Now at: Vatican Library
- Size: 20.8 cm by 16.3 cm
- Type: Alexandrian text-type
- Category: III

Minuscule 436 (in the Gregory-Aland numbering), α 172 (in the Soden numbering), is a Greek minuscule manuscript of the New Testament, on parchment. Palaeographically it has been assigned to the 11th or 12th century. Formerly it was labelled by 73^{a} and 80^{p}.

== Description ==
The codex contains the text of the Acts of the Apostles, Catholic epistles, and Pauline epistles on 165 parchment leaves (20.8 cm by 16.3 cm) with only one lacuna (Epistle to Philemon). Written in one column per page, in 30 lines per page. The leaves are arranged in quarto.

It contains Prolegomena, lists of the κεφαλαια (tables of contents) before each book, Menaion, lectionary markings at the margin (for church reading), Synaxarion, Menologion, and stichoi.

The order of books: Acts, Catholic epistles, Pauline epistles (Hebrews, 1 Timothy).

== Text ==
The Greek text of the codex is a representative of the Alexandrian text-type with numerous allies reading. Aland placed it in Category III.

According to F. H. A. Scrivener it is an excellent manuscript. According to Gregory its text is good.

In Romans 8:1 it has singular reading Ιησου κατα σαρκα περιπατουσιν αλλα κατα πνευμα, majority of manuscripts reads Ιησου μη κατα σαρκα περιπατουσιν αλλα κατα πνευμα.

In 1 Corinthians 2:1 it reads μυστηριον along with 𝔓^{46}, א, Α, C, 88, it^{a,r}, syr^{p}, cop^{bo}. Other manuscripts read μαρτυριον or σωτηριον.

In 1 Timothy 3:16 it has textual variant θεός ἐφανερώθη (God manifested) (Sinaiticus^{e}, A^{2}, C^{2}, D^{c}, K, L, P, Ψ, 81, 104, 181, 326, 330, 451, 614, 629, 630, 1241, 1739, 1877, 1881, 1962, 1984, 1985, 2492, 2495, Byz, Lect), against ὃς ἐφανερώθη (he was manifested) supported by Sinaiticus, Codex Alexandrinus, Ephraemi, Boernerianus, 33, 365, 442, 2127, ℓ 599.

In 2 Timothy 4:10 it reads Γαλλιαν, along with Sinaiticus C 81 104 326; other manuscript read Γαλατιαν.

In Hebrews 8:11 it reads πλησιον for πολιτην — P, 81, 104, 629, 630, and 1985.

== History ==
The manuscript was used by Caryophilus. It was examined by Birch and Scholz. C. R. Gregory saw it in 1886.

The manuscript was added to the list of the New Testament manuscripts by Scholz (1794-1852).

Formerly it was labelled by 73^{a} and 80^{p}. In 1908 Gregory gave the number 436 to it.

The codex is cited in critical editions of the Greek New Testament (NA26).

It is currently housed at the Vatican Library (Vat. gr. 367) in Rome.

== See also ==
- List of New Testament minuscules
- Biblical manuscript
- Textual criticism
