= Minuscule 6 =

Greek minuscule manuscript of the New Testament

- New Testament manuscript
- Text: New Testament (except Rev)
- Date: 13th century
- Script: Greek
- Now at: Bibliothèque nationale de France
- Size: 14.5 cm by 10.5 cm
- Type: Alexandrian / Byzantine close to Minuscule 4
- Category: III/V
- Hand: elegantly written
- Note: marginalia

Minuscule 6 is a Greek minuscule manuscript of the New Testament, written on parchment. It is designated by the siglum 6 in the Gregory-Aland numbering of New Testament manuscripts, and δ 356 in the von Soden numbering of New Testament manuscripts. Using the study of comparative writing styles (palaeography), it has been dated to the 13th century. The manuscript has complex contents and full marginal notes. It was adapted for liturgical use.

== Description ==
The manuscript is a codex (precursor to the modern book format), containing the entirety of the New Testament except the Book of Revelation made of 235 parchment leaves (14.4 cm by 10.5 cm), with one gap - Titus 2:2-end, and Philemon 1:1-11 are missing. It has the Catholic epistles placed before the Pauline epistles, something not done in modern bibles. The text is written in one column per page, 29-47 lines per page. It is written in elegant small letters.

The text is divided according to the chapters (known as κεφαλαια / kephalaia), whose numbers are given in the margin, and their titles (known as τιτλοι / titloi) at the top of the pages. The text of the Gospels is also divided according to the smaller Ammonian Sections (Matthew 356, Mark 234 – the last section in 16:9, Luke 342, and John 226).

It contains introductions (known as prolegomena), with the tables of contents (also known as κεφαλαια) placed before each book; it contains synaxaria, the Euthalian Apparatus, and ornamentations. At the end it has the liturgy of John Chrysostom. The subscriptions at the end of each book which contain the numbers of lines (known as στιχοι / stichoi) were added by a later hand.

The order of books is as follows: Gospels, Book of Acts, Catholic epistles, Pauline epistles. At the end of the Second Epistle to Timothy it has the subscription Τιμοθεον Β' απο Ρωμης (Second Timothy, from Rome), the same subscription as seen in the manuscripts Codex Porphyrianus (P), Minuscule 1739 and 1881.

== Text ==
The text of the Catholic epistles and Pauline epistles are considered a representative of the Alexandrian text-type, with numerous alien readings. Biblical scholar Kurt Aland placed these books from the manuscript in Category III of his New Testament manuscript classification system. Category III manuscripts are described as having "a small but not a negligible proportion of early readings, with a considerable encroachment of [Byzantine] readings, and significant readings from other sources as yet unidentified." This text belongs to the textual Family 1739. In the Gospels and Acts it is considered a representative of the Byzantine text-type, close to the text seen in Minuscule 4. Aland placed these books from the manuscript in Category V. Category V manuscripts are described as "manuscripts with a purely or predominantly Byzantine text."

According to the Claremont Profile Method (a specific analysis of textual data), in Luke 1, Luke 10, and Luke 20 it belongs to the textual group Π6, along with Codex Petropolitanus.

Some notable readings:

Romans 3:12

ουκ εστιν (does not exist)

omit — 6 B 424** 1739
include – Majority of manuscripts

1 Corinthians 1:14

τω θεω (to God)

omit – 6 א B 424** 1739
include – Majority of manuscripts

1 Corinthians 7:5

τη προσευχη (prayer) – 6 𝔓^{11} 𝔓^{46} א* A B] C D F G P Ψ 33 81 104 181 629 630 1739 1877 1881 1962 it vg cop arm eth
τη νηστεια και τη προσευχη (fasting and prayer) – Majority of manuscripts

Galatians 1:15

και καλεσας δια της χαριτος αυτου (and called by his favour)

omit — 6 𝔓^{46} 424** 1739 1881
include – Majority of manuscripts

Ephesians 1:1

εν εφεσω (in Ephesus)

omit — 6 𝔓^{46} B 424** 1739
include – Majority of manuscripts

Ephesians 4:28

ταις (ιδιαις) χερσιν (his (own) hands)

omit — 6 P 424** 1739 1881
include – Majority of manuscripts

Ephesians 5:31

και προσκολληθησεται προς την γυναικα αυτου (and be joined to his wife)

omit — 6 1739* Origen Jerome
include – Majority of manuscripts

1 Timothy 3:14

προς σε (towards you)

omit — 6 F G 263 424** 1739 1881
include – Majority of manuscripts

2 Timothy 4:8

πασσι (to all)

omit — 6 D** 424** (1739) 1881 lat Ambrosiaster
include – Majority of manuscripts

Hebrews 5:12

τινα (someone)

omit — 6 Uncial 075 424** 1739 1881
include – Majority of manuscripts

Jude 12

ευωχιαις (happy feasts) – 6
αγαπαις (love feasts) – Majority of manuscripts

== History ==
The manuscript once belonged to Fontainebleau. It was used by scholar Robert Estienne in his Editio Regia, and designated by him as ε'. It was examined by biblical scholars Johann Jakob Wettstein, Johann Jakob Griesbach, and Johann M. A. Scholz (though Scholz only examined Matthew, Mark 1-4, and John 7), and in 1885 it was examined by biblical scholar Caspar René Gregory. It was also examined and described by scholar Paulin Martin. Wettstein gave the number 6 to it. This number is still in use.

In 27 editions of the Nestle-Aland Novum Testamentum Graece, it is cited only twice (1 Cor 11:24; 15:6). The manuscript is currently located in the Bibliothèque nationale de France (National Library of France, shelf number Gr. 112) in Paris.

== See also ==
- Minuscule 7
- Minuscule 5
- List of New Testament minuscules
- Textus Receptus
- Textual criticism
