= Minuscule 88 =

- New Testament manuscript
- Name: Codex Regis
- Text: Acts, Paul, Rev.
- Date: 12th-century
- Script: Greek
- Now at: Biblioteca Nazionale Vittorio Emanuele III
- Size: 26.5 cm by 18.6 cm
- Type: mixed
- Category: III
- Note: incomplete marginalia

Codex Regis (Minuscule 88 in the Gregory-Aland numbering) (α 200 in von Soden's numbering), is a Greek minuscule manuscript of the New Testament, on parchment leaves. Palaeographically it has been assigned to the 12th-century. It has marginalia.

Formerly it was labelled by 83^{a}, 93^{p}, and 99^{r}.

== Description ==
The codex contains the text of the Acts of the Apostles, Catholic epistles, Pauline epistles (He, 1 Tim), and the Book of Revelation, on 123 parchment leaves (size 26.5 cm by 18.6 cm), with some lacunae. The text is written in two columns per page, 37 lines per page.

It contains prolegomena, tables of the κεφαλαια (tables of contents) before each book, many lists, numbers of the κεφαλαια (chapters) in the margin (sometimes), and the Comma Johanneum (added on the margin by a later hand).

It was assigned the number 88 by Caspar René Gregory.

The section 1 Corinthians 14:34-35 is placed after 1 Corinthians 14:40, which is its location in manuscripts of the Western text-type (Claromontanus, Augiensis, Boernerianus, it^{ar,e}), and one manuscript of the Vulgate (Codex Reginensis).

== Text ==
The Greek text of the codex Aland placed in Category III. According to F. H. A. Scrivener it is close textually to 63, 72, 80.

It contains, in the margin, the text of Acts 8:37.

In Acts 27:39 it reads εκσωσαι for εξοσαι along with B*, C, cop^{sa, bo}, arm.

In Romans 8:1 it reads Ιησου κατα σαρκα περιπατουσιν αλλα κατα πνευμα, for Ιησου. The reading of the manuscript is supported by third corrector of Sinaiticus (א^{c}), D^{c}, K, P, 33, 104, 181, 326, 330, (436 omit μη), 456, 614, 630, 1241, 1877, 1962, 1984, 1985, 2492, 2495, Byz, Lect.

In 1 Corinthians 2:1 it reads μυστηριον along with 𝔓^{46}, א, Α, C, 436, it^{a,r}, syr^{p}, cop^{bo}. Other manuscripts read μαρτυριον or σωτηριον.

In 1 Timothy 3:16 it reads ο θεος for ος.

In 1 John 5:6 it has textual variant δι' ὕδατος καὶ πνεύματος καὶ αἵματος (through water and spirit and blood) together with the manuscripts: Codex Porphyrianus, 81, 442, 630, 915, 2492, arm, eth. (Note: For another variants of this verse see: Textual variants in the First Epistle of John.) Bart D. Ehrman identified it as Orthodox corrupt reading. It contains the Comma Johanneum added by a later hand on the margin.

== History ==
The manuscript was written by Evagrius and compared with Pamphilus copy at Caesarea. It was examined by Joachim Camerarius (in 1574), Birch, Scholz, Dean Burgon, Ernst von Dobschütz. C. R. Gregory saw it in 1886.

Formerly it was labelled by 83^{a}, 93^{p}, and 99^{r}. In 1908 Gregory gave the number 88 to it.

It is currently housed in at the Biblioteca Nazionale Vittorio Emanuele III (Ms. II. A.7), at Naples.

== See also ==
- List of New Testament minuscules
- Biblical manuscript
- Textual criticism
