= Minuscule 424 =

- New Testament manuscript
- Text: Acts, Catholic Epistles, Pauline Epistles, and Revelation
- Date: 11th century
- Script: Greek
- Now at: Austrian National Library
- Size: 18.2 cm by 14 cm
- Type: mixed (epist.; Rev), Byzantine (Acts)
- Category: III, V

Minuscule 424 is a Greek minuscule manuscript of the New Testament containing the book of Acts, the Pauline Epistles, the Catholic Epistles, and Revelation, written on parchment. It is designated by the siglum 424 in the Gregory-Aland numbering of New Testament manuscripts, and Ο^{12} in the von Soden numbering of New Testament manuscripts. Using the study of comparative writing styles (palaeography), it has been assigned to the 11th century. It was formerly designated by the number 66^{a} (Acts), 67^{p} (Epistles), and 34^{r} (Revelation).

== Description ==
The manuscript is a codex (precursor to the modern book format), containing the text of the Acts of the Apostles, Catholic epistles, Pauline epistles, and Revelation on 353 parchment leaves (18.2 cm by 14 cm). The text is written in one column per page, with 22 lines per page.

It contains Prolegomena (to the Acts and Pauline epistles), the Synaxarion (a list of daily lessons in the church's calendar), Menologion (a calendar of Saint's days), subscriptions at the end of each book, and pictures. The Catholic epistles have subscriptions with the numbers of lines (known as στιχοι / stichoi). Three different hands have made corrections. According to Biblical scholar Frederick H. A. Scrivener, textual critic Johann J. Griesbach considered the corrections "as far more valuable than the text."

According to the subscription at the end of the Epistle to the Romans, the letter was: επιστολη προς Ρωμαιους εγραφη δια Φοιβης διακονου της εν Κεγχρειαις εκκλησιας. (Epistle to the Romans, written by Phoebe, deaconess of the church in Cenchrea). The codex was corrected against one or more other manuscripts which had a closely related textual relationship, hence displaying many alternative readings to the initial copyist.

== Text ==
The Greek text of Acts in the codex is considered a representative of the Byzantine text-type, but in the Epistles it has been subjected to a thorough revision to bring it into conformity with the text of the exemplar of Minuscule 1739. The text-types are groups of different New Testament manuscripts which share specific or generally related readings, which then differ from each other group, and thus the conflicting readings can separate out the groups. These are then used to determine the original text as published; there are three main groups with names: Alexandrian, Western, and Byzantine. Biblical scholar Kurt Aland placed it in Category V of his New Testament classification system for the book of Acts. The text of the Epistles has a higher value; Aland therefore placed it in Category III. Category III manuscripts are described as having "a small but not a negligible proportion of early readings, with a considerable encroachment of [Byzantine] readings, and significant readings from other sources as yet unidentified." Category V manuscripts are "Manuscripts with a purely or predominantly Byzantine text." Its readings often agree with those seen in the manuscript Minuscule 1739.

In Acts 24:6b-8a it has unique reading: εκρατησαμεν και κατα τον ημετερον νομον ηβουληθημεν κριναι κατα τον ημετερον νομον ελθων δε ο χιλιαρχος Λυσιας βια πολλη εκ των χειρων ημων αφιλετο και προς δε απεστειλε κελευσας τους κατηγορους αυτου ερχεσθαι προς σε.

In a marginal note at 1 John 5:6, corrector c has added the reading: δι' ὕδατος καὶ αἵματος καὶ πνεύματος (through water and blood and spirit), a reading also seen in the manuscripts Codex Sinaiticus (א), Codex Alexandrinus (A), Minuscule 104, 614, 1739^{c}, 2412, 2495, ℓ 598^{m}, syr^{h}, Sahidic, Boharic, and in the writings of Origen. (Note: For the other variants of this verse see: Textual variants in the First Epistle of John.) Scholar Bart D. Ehrman considers this textual variant as an Orthodox corrupted reading. A transcription of the text of Acts in the manuscript is available from the INTF Virtual Manuscript Room.

== History ==
The manuscript once belonged to Arsenius, Archbishop of Momembasia, then to Sebastian Tengnagel and John Sambue. It was examined by Treschow, Francis Karl Alter, Andreas Birch, and Johann J. Griesbach all who noted the variant readings. Alter used it in his edition of the Greek New Testament (vol. 2, 415-558). Biblical scholar Caspar René Gregory saw it in 1887.

It was previously designated by 66^{a}, 67^{p} and 34^{r}. In 1908, Gregory assigned it the number 424. The manuscript is currently housed at the Austrian National Library (Theol. gr. 302) in Vienna.

== See also ==
- List of New Testament minuscules
- Biblical manuscript
- Textual criticism
- Family 1739
