= Codex Vaticanus 354 =

Uncial 028
- New Testament manuscript
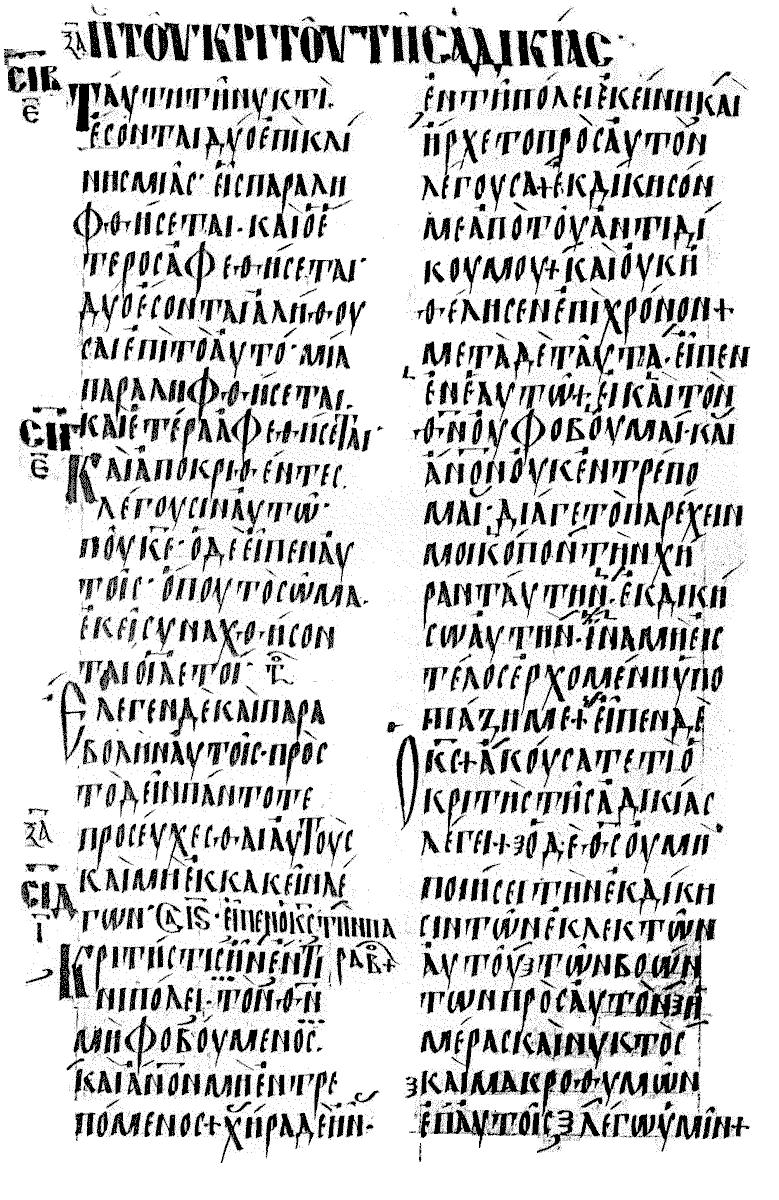
- Gospel of Luke 17:34-18:8
- Name: Vaticanus 354
- Sign: S
- Text: Gospels
- Date: 949
- Script: Greek
- Now at: Vatican Library
- Size: 36 cm by 24 cm
- Type: Byzantine text-type
- Category: V
- Note: first dated uncial

Codex Vaticanus 354, formerly called Codex Guelpherbytanus, is a Greek manuscript of the four Gospels written on parchment. It is designated by S or 028 in the Gregory-Aland numbering of New Testament manuscripts, and ε 1027 in the von Soden numbering of New Testament manuscripts. A colophon on the reverse side of folio 234 lists the production date as 949 CE. This manuscript is one of the four oldest New Testament manuscripts dated in this manner, and the only dated uncial. The manuscript has complex contents.

== Description ==
The manuscript is a codex (precursor to the modern book), containing the complete text of the four Gospels written on 235 parchment leaves (36 cm by 24 cm). The text is written in two columns per page, 27 lines per page, 15-17 letters per line. Contrary to what biblical scholar Caspar René Gregory stated, it has breathings and accents. The nomina sacra (sacred names, this being words/titles considered sacred in Christianity) are employed in the manuscript. The text is divided according to the chapters (known as κεφαλαια / kephalaia), whose numbers are given in the margin, and their titles (known as τιτλοι / titloi) at the top of the pages. There is also a division according to the smaller Ammonian sections, with references to the Eusebian Canons.

It contains the Epistle to Carpius (a letter from the early church father Eusebius outlying his gospel section division tables and usage), tables of contents (also known as κεφαλαια) before each Gospel, and subscriptions at the end of each Gospel, along with the numbers of lines (known as στιχοι / stichoi). It contains many later corrections and margin notes predominantly added by later hand. It also includes neumes, and it is one of the oldest manuscript with neumes. The writing is large, oblong and compressed, which is characteristic of a style labelled "Slavic".

== Text ==
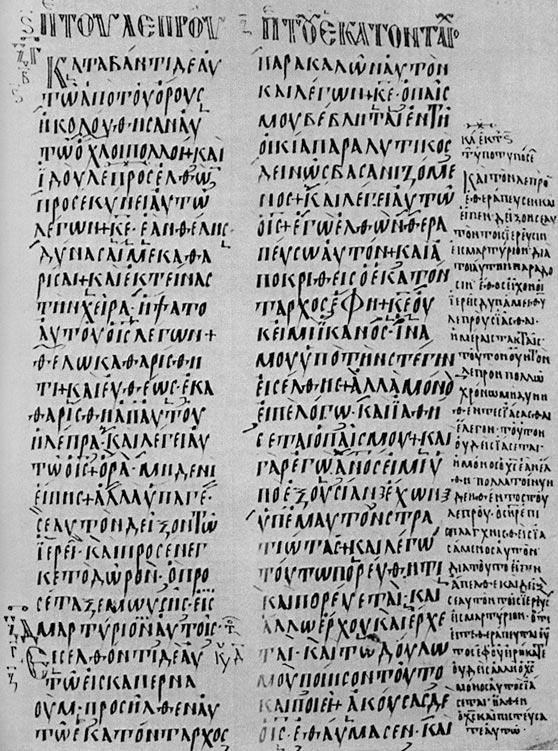
Gospel of Matthew 8:1-10 in Vaticanus 354

The Greek text of this codex is considered a representative of the Byzantine text-type in close relationship to Codex Mosquensis II (V) and Codex Washingtonianus (W). Biblical scholar Kurt Aland placed it in Category V of his New Testament manuscript classification system. Category V manuscripts are described as "manuscripts with a purely or predominantly Byzantine text." According to Aland's test passages, the manuscript agrees 206 times with the majority Byzantine text, 105 times with the Byzantine and "original" text, 4 times with the "original text" against the Byzantine, and has 12 distinct readings (these being readings found only in this manuscript). It belongs to the textual family K^{1}.

In a marginal note beside Matthew 27:21, it reads: "In many ancient copies which I have met with I found Barabbas himself likewise called Jesus; that is, the question of Pilate stood there as follows, Τινα θελετε απο των δυο απολυσω υμιν, Ιησουν τον Βαραββαν η Ιησουν τον λεγομενον Χριστον; for apparently the paternal name of the robber was Barabbas, which is interpreted Son of the teacher".

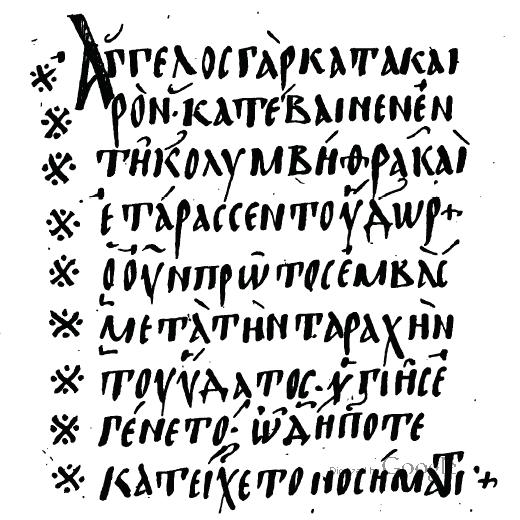
John 5:4

The disputed texts of Luke 22:44, John 5:4, and Pericope Adulterae are marked by asterisks (※) as questionable texts. In the latter it reads επορευετο instead of επορευθη.

== History ==
The name of the scribe was Michael, a monk, who finished his work "in the month of March, the fifth day, the sixth hour, the year 6457, the seventh indiction".

The manuscript was examined and described by Bianchini. It was collated with some errors by Andrew Birch in 1781–1783, but collators in his day rarely noticed orthographical forms. In 1866, textual critic Constantin von Tischendorf corrected the collation of Birch. Tischendorf states that the facsimile of Bianchini was coarsely executed, so he made another for himself.

The codex is currently located in Rome (Bibl. Vat. Gr. 354).

== See also ==
- List of New Testament uncials
- List of New Testament papyri
- Textual criticism
