= Codex Petropolitanus (New Testament) =

Uncial 041
- New Testament manuscript
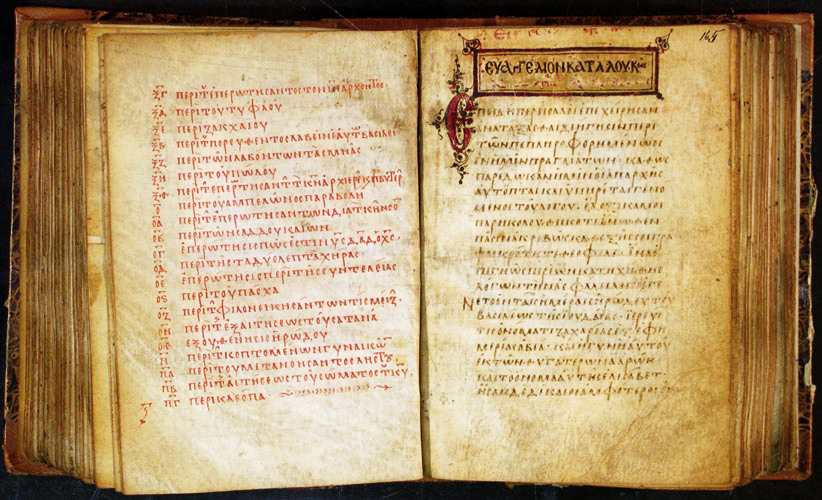
- Beginning of Luke
- Name: Petropolitanus
- Sign: Π
- Text: Gospels
- Date: 9th-century
- Script: Greek
- Found: Tischendorf, 1859
- Now at: National Library of Russia
- Size: 14.5 x 10.5 cm
- Type: Byzantine text-type
- Category: V
- Note: member of the family Π

Codex Petropolitanus (Russian, "Петербургский кодекс" Peterburgskiy Kodeks), designated by Π or 041 (in the Gregory-Aland numbering), ε 73 (von Soden), is a Greek uncial manuscript of the Gospels, dated palaeographically to the 9th-century. The manuscript is lacunose.

== Description ==
The codex contains an almost complete text of the four Gospels on 350 parchment leaves (14.5 cm by 10.5 cm) with some lacunae in Matt 3:12-4:17; 19:12-20:2; Luke 1:76-2:18; John 6:15-35; 8:6-39; 9:21-10:3. Texts of Mark 16:18-20 and John 21:22-25 were supplied by minuscule hand in the 12th-century.

The text is written in one column per page, 21 lines per page. The letters are small, with breathings, and accents.

The tables of the κεφαλαια before each Gospel. The text is divided according to the Ammonian Sections with a references to the Eusebian Canons.

The texts of John 5:4 and 8:3-6 are marked by an asterisk (manuscript is lacunae from v6 from κύψας to after τέκνα in 8:39).

== Text ==
The Greek text of this codex is a representative of the Byzantine text-type, in close relationship to the Codex Alexandrinus, and other later uncials. Together with Codex Cyprius it belongs to the textual family Π. Aland placed it in Category V.

Luke 9:55-56

στραφεις δε επετιμησεν αυτοις και ειπεν, Ουκ οιδατε ποιου πνευματος εστε υμεις; ο γαρ υιος του ανθρωπου ουκ ηλθεν ψυχας ανθρωπων απολεσαι αλλα σωσαι (but He turned and rebuked them and He said: "You do not know what manner of spirit you are of; for the Son of man came not to destroy men's lives but to save them) — as in codices Codex Cyprius 1079 1242 1546 (f^{1} omit γαρ) (Θ f^{13} omit υμεις and γαρ).

== History ==
Found

The manuscript belonged to the family Parodi in Smyrna. It was brought by Tischendorf in 1859.

Present location

The codex is located in the National Library of Russia (Gr. 34) in Saint Petersburg.

== See also ==
- List of New Testament uncials
- Codex Petropolitanus (disambiguation)
- Textual criticism
