= Minuscule 1739 =

- New Testament manuscript
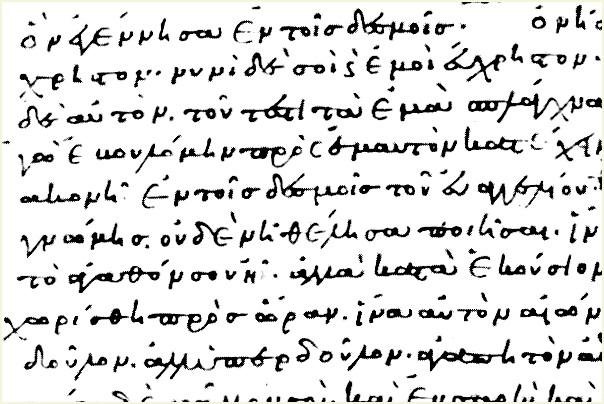
- Text: Acts, CE, Paul
- Date: 10th century
- Script: Greek
- Found: 1897, von der Goltz
- Now at: Great Lavra, B 184
- Size: 23 cm by 17.5 cm
- Type: Alexandrian text-type
- Category: I / II
- Note: close to 𝔓^{46} and B

Minuscule 1739 or Codex Athous Laurae 184 is a Greek minuscule manuscript of the New Testament made of parchment. It is designated as 1739 in the Gregory-Aland numbering of New Testament manuscripts, and as α 78 in the von Soden numbering of New Testament manuscripts. Using the study of comparative writing styles (palaeography), it is dated to the 10th century.

== Description ==
The manuscript is a codex (precursor to the modern book), containing the text of the Acts of the Apostles, Catholic epistles, and Pauline epistles on 102 parchment leaves (23 cm by 17.5 cm). The text is written in one column per page, 35 lines per page. The Epistle to the Hebrews is placed before 1 Timothy. It contains marginal notes, with lectionary markings added by a later hand. There is however evidence that the manuscript might originally have been a full copy of the New Testament (without Revelation), due to the current first collection of pages stating they are the 13th, of which twelve earlier collection of pages could have contained the text of the four Gospels.

It contains a large number of notes drawn from early church fathers such as Irenaeus, Clement, Origen, Eusebius, and Basil of Caesarea, but none later than Basil (329-379 CE), suggesting a relatively early date for the manuscript from which 1739 was copied. The text of this manuscript often agrees with 𝔓^{46} and Codex Vaticanus. A colophon indicates that while copying the Pauline epistles, the scribe followed a manuscript that contained text edited by Origen.

At the end of the Second Epistle to Timothy it has the subscription προς τιμοθεον β' εγραφη απο ρωμης (2nd to Timothy, written from Rome). The same subscription appears in manuscripts Codex Porphyrianus (P), Minuscule 6, 1881, and some others.

== Text ==
The Greek text of this codex is considered a representative of the Alexandrian text-type. Biblical scholar Kurt Aland placed the text of the Epistles in Category I, but the text of the Acts in Category II of his New Testament manuscript classification system. It was not examined using the Claremont Profile Method (a specific analysis of textual data).

Together with the minuscule manuscripts 323, 630, 945, and 1891 it belongs to the textual Family 1739 (in Acts). In the Pauline Epistles this family includes the following manuscripts: Uncial 0121a, 0243/0121b, 6, 424, 630 (in part), and 1881. In a marginal note to the text of 1 John 5:6, a corrector added the reading δι' ὕδατος καὶ αἵματος καὶ πνεύματος (through water, and blood, and spirit) as found in the following manuscripts: Codex Sinaiticus (א), Codex Alexandrinus, 104, 424^{c}, 614, 2412, 2495, ℓ 598^{m}, sy^{h}, sa, bo, and by the early church father Origen. (Note: For other variants of this verse see: Textual variants in the First Epistle of John.) Biblical scholar Bart D. Ehrman says this reading is an Orthodox corrupt reading. Due to its affinities with 𝔓^{46} and Codex Vaticanus, scholar G. Zuntz concluded, "[w]ithin the wider affinities of the ‘Alexandrian’ tradition, the Vaticanus is now seen to stand out as a member of a group with P46 and the preancestor of 1739."

Some notable readings

Acts 8:37

Include verse: 1739 E^{a} 323 453 945 1891 2818 al
Omit verse: 𝔓^{45} 𝔓^{74} א A B C 33 81 614 vg sy^{p,} ^{h} sa bo eth

Acts 8:39

πνεῦμα ἅγιον ἐπέπεσεν ἐπὶ τὸν εὐνοῦχον, ἄγγελος δέ κυρίου ἥρπασεν τὸν Φίλιππον ([the] Holy Spirit fell on the eunuch, and [the] angel of [the] Lord caught up Philip): 1739 A 94 103 307 322 323 385 453 467 945 1765 1891 2298 36^{a} it^{p} vg sy^{h}
πνεῦμα κυρίου ἥρπασεν τὸν Φίλιππον ([The] Spirit of [the] Lord caught up Philip): Majority of manuscripts

Acts 12:25

εξ Ιερουσαλημ εις Αντιοχειαν (from Jerusalem to Antioch): 1739 E^{a} 429 945 sy^{p} sa geo
εις Ιερουσαλημ (to Jerusalem): Majority of manuscripts

Acts 20:28

του κυριου (of the Lord): 1739 𝔓^{74} C* D E Ψ 33 36 453 945 1891
του θεου (of God): א A B 614 1175 1505 vg sy bo^{ms}
του κυριου και του Θεου (of the Lord and God): Majority of manuscripts (Note: For the other variants of this verse see: Textual variants in the Acts of the Apostles.)

1 Corinthians 7:5

τη προσευχη (prayer): 1739 h 𝔓^{11} 𝔓^{46} א* A B C D F G P Ψ 6 33 81 104 181 629 630 1877 1881 1962 it vg cop arm eth
τη νηστεια και τη προσευχη (fasting and prayer): Majority of manuscripts

1 Corinthians 15:54

το φθαρτον τουτο ενδυσηται αφθαρσιαν και (This corruptible shall put on incorruption)

omit: 1739* 𝔓^{46} א* 088 0121a 0243 614 629 1175 1852 1877 1912 2200
include: 1739^{c} א^{c2} B C^{c2(vid)} D Ψ 075 1881 Majority of manuscripts

== History ==
The manuscript was copied by a monk named Ephraim, from whom we have at least three other manuscripts. He copied 1739 from an uncial exemplar which may have been from around the 4th century. Scholar G. Zuntz finds close links between the manuscript and the text contained in 𝔓^{46}, Codex Vaticanus, the Coptic Sahidic and Boharic, Clement of Alexandria and Origen. The manuscript was studied by E. von der Goltz in 1897 at Mount Athos and is usually known by his name. A collation was made by Morton S. Enslin (in Kirsopp Lake Six Collations). Professor J. de Zwaan and biblical scholar Kirsopp Lake saw the manuscript in 1911, but were unable to take photographs of it for further study. Scholar Robert P. Blake took a photostat copy of the manuscript in 1921, from which Enslin made a collation (as mentioned above).

The manuscript is currently housed at the Great Lavra monastery (shelf number B 184), on Mount Athos in Greece. It is currently dated by the INTF to the 10th century CE.

== See also ==
- List of New Testament minuscules (1001–2000)
- Biblical manuscripts
- Textual criticism
