= Minuscule 1241 =

- New Testament manuscript
- Date: 12th century
- Script: Greek
- Now at: Mount Sinai

Minuscule 1241 (in the Gregory-Aland numbering), δ371 (Soden), is a Greek minuscule manuscript of the New Testament, on parchment, attributed through palaeography to the twelfth century. The text contains most of the New Testament, lacking the Book of Revelation, and is notable for its diversity between Alexandrian and Byzantine textual variants, and for its numerous scribal errors.

It remains housed at Saint Catherine's Monastery, in Egypt, the site of its original discovery.

== See also ==
- List of New Testament minuscules
- Biblical manuscript
- Textual criticism
