= Textual variants in the Gospel of Luke =

Differences in New Testament manuscripts

Textual variants in the Gospel of Luke are the subject of the study called textual criticism of the New Testament. Textual variants in manuscripts arise when a copyist makes deliberate or inadvertent alterations to a text that is being reproduced. An abbreviated list of textual variants in this particular book is given in this article below.

Most of the variations are not significant and some common alterations include the deletion, rearrangement, repetition, or replacement of one or more words when the copyist's eye returns to a similar word in the wrong location of the original text. If their eye skips to an earlier word, they may create a repetition (error of dittography). If their eye skips to a later word, they may create an omission. They may resort to performing a rearranging of words to retain the overall meaning without compromising the context. In other instances, the copyist may add text from memory from a similar or parallel text in another location. Otherwise, they may also replace some text of the original with an alternative reading. Spellings occasionally change. Synonyms may be substituted. A pronoun may be changed into a proper noun (such as "he said" becoming "Jesus said"). John Mill's 1707 Greek New Testament was estimated to contain some 30,000 variants in its accompanying textual apparatus which was based on "nearly 100 [Greek] manuscripts." Peter J. Gurry puts the number of non-spelling variants among New Testament manuscripts around 500,000, though he acknowledges his estimate is higher than all previous ones.

Scholars find that many textual variants in the narratives of the Nativity of Jesus (Luke 2, as well as Matthew 1–2) and the Finding in the Temple (Luke 2:41–52) involve deliberate alterations such as substituting the words 'his father' with 'Joseph', or 'his parents' with 'Joseph and his mother'. Alexander Globe (1980) concluded 'that most of the non-Neutral readings under consideration were introduced to remove inconsistencies between the biblical narratives and abstract doctrinal statements concerning the virginity of Mary.'

== Legend ==
A guide to the sigla (symbols and abbreviations) most frequently used in the body of this article.

General sigla
# beginning with 0: uncial
# not beginning with 0: minuscule
^{*} superscript: original reading
^{c} superscript: scribal correction
^{ms} superscript: individual manuscript
^{mss} superscript: multiple manuscripts
^{pt} superscript: partial attestation
^{vid} superscript: uncertain reading
arab: Arabic versions
arm: Armenian versions
𝔐 or Byz: Byzantine text-type
cop: Coptic versions

sa: Sahidic version
bo: Boharic version

eth: Ethiopic versions
ƒ: Greek manuscripts family
geo: Georgian versions
goth: Gothic versions
it: Italic/Vetus Latina
lat: most Italic and Vulgate
latt: all Italic and Vulgate
𝔓: papyrus
𝑙: individually numbered lectionary
Lect: most or all numbered lectionaries
parenthesized (): approximate reading
rell: all other extant manuscripts
slav: Slavic versions
syr: Syriac versions
vg: Latin Vulgate
ς: Textus Receptus

Uncial sigla
א: Codex Sinaiticus (01)
A: Codex Alexandrinus (02)
B: Codex Vaticanus (03)
C: Codex Ephraemi Rescriptus (04)
D^{ea}: Codex Bezae (05)
D^{p}: Codex Claromontanus (06)
K^{e}: Codex Cyprius (017)
K^{ap}: Codex Mosquensis I (018)
L^{e}: Codex Regius (New Testament) (019)
L^{ap}: Codex Angelicus (020)
P^{apr}: Codex Porphyrianus (025)
S: Codex Vaticanus 354 (028)
V: Codex Mosquensis II (031)
W: Codex Washingtonianus (032)
Z: Codex Dublinensis (035)
Γ: Codex Tischendorfianus IV (036)
Δ: Codex Sangallensis 48 (037)
Θ: Codex Koridethi (038)
Ξ: Codex Zacynthius (040)
Π: Codex Petropolitanus (New Testament) (041)
Φ: Codex Beratinus (043)
Ψ: Codex Athous Lavrensis (044)
Ω: Codex Athous Dionysiou (045)
ff^{1}: Codex Corbeiensis I
ff^{2}: Codex Corbeiensis II
g^{1}: Codex Sangermanensis I
k: Codex Bobiensis

Critical editions
T8th: Tischendorf's 8th Edition of Editio Octava Critica Maior
WH: Westcott and Hort (1881)
NA: Novum Testamentum Graece (Nestle–Aland)
UBS: United Bible Societies
ECM: Editio Critica Maior

== Textual variants ==
Textual variants in the Gospel of Luke

3 Textual variants in Luke 1

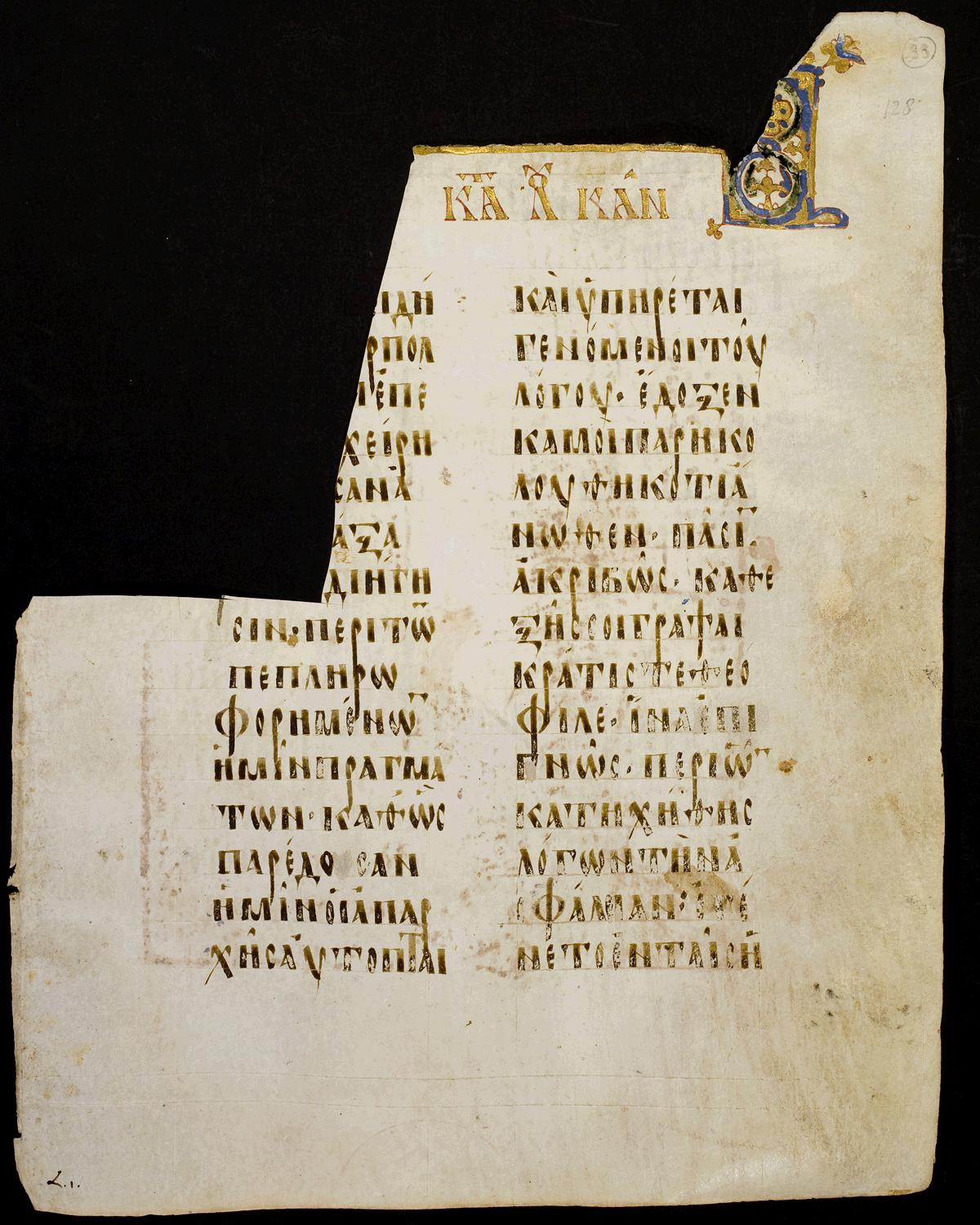
Codex Boreelianus, beginning of Luke

Luke 1:28

καὶ εἰσελθὼν πρὸς αὐτὴν εἶπεν Χαῖρε, κεχαριτωμένη, ὁ Κύριος μετὰ σοῦ. (and [he] went to her and said: "Greetings, favoured one, the lord is with you.") – Alexandrian text-type: Westcott and Hort 1881, Westcott and Hort / [NA27 and UBS4 variants], 1864–94, Nestle 1904
καὶ εἰσελθὼν πρὸς αὐτὴν ὁ ἄγγελος εἶπεν· χαῖρε, κεχαριτωμένη, ὁ κύριος μετὰ σοῦ. (and the angel went to her and said: "Greetings, favoured one, the lord is with you.") – Tischendorf 8th Edition
Καὶ εἰσελθὼν ὁ ἄγγελος πρὸς αὐτὴν εἴπεν, Χαῖρε, κεχαριτωμένη· ὁ κύριος μετὰ σοῦ, εὐλογημένη σὺ ἐν γυναιξίν. (And the angel went to her and said: "Greetings, favoured one, the Lord is with you, you are blessed among women.") – Byz: Stephanus Textus Receptus 1550, Scrivener's Textus Receptus 1894, RP Byzantine Majority Text 2005, Greek Orthodox Church

Luke 1:29

ἡ δὲ ἐπὶ τῷ λόγῳ διεταράχθη, (and she was troubled at the words,) – Alexandrian text-type: Westcott and Hort 1881, Westcott and Hort / [NA27 and UBS4 variants], 1864–94, Tischendorf 8th Edition, Nestle 1904
Ἡ δὲ ἰδοῦσα διεταράχθη ἐπὶ τῷ λόγῳ αὐτοῦ, (And when she saw [him], she was troubled at his words,) – Byz: Stephanus Textus Receptus 1550, Scrivener's Textus Receptus 1894, RP Byzantine Majority Text 2005, Greek Orthodox Church

Luke 1:75

πάσαις ταῖς ἡμέραις ἡμῶν. (all our days) – Alexandrian text-type
πάσας τὰς ἡμέρας τῆς ζωῆς ἡμῶν. (all the days of our lives) – Byz

16 Textual variants in Luke 2

Luke 2:5

γυναικί (woman) – Byz
omitted by Alexandrian text-type

Luke 2:7

φατνη (manger) – א A B D L W Θ Ξ 700
τη φατνη (the manger) – Ψ 053 f^{1} f^{13} Byz
τω σπηλαιω φατνη (the cave's manger) – Origen (via Epiphanius)

Luke 2:9

καὶ ἄγγελος (and the angel) – Alexandrian text-type
Καὶ ἰδού, ἄγγελος (And see, the angel) – Byz

εφοβηθησαν σφοδρα (they feared exceedingly) – Β
εφοβηθησαν φοβον μεγαν (they feared with great fear) – א A D L Ψ 053 f^{1} f^{13} Byz
εφοβηθησαν φοβον μεγαν σφοδρα (they feared with exceedingly great fear) – W cop^{sa}

Luke 2:12

κείμενον (lying) – omitted by Tischendorf 8th Edition

Luke 2:14

εὐδοκίας (of good will or of favour – genitive) – Alexandrian text-type
εὐδοκία (good will or favour – nominative) – Byzantine text-type

Luke 2:21

ἐπλήσθησαν (fulfilled) – א Β A L Ψ 053 f^{1} f^{13} Byz
επληρωθησαν (finished) – Θ 33
συνετελέσθησαν (completed) – D cop^{sa}

Luke 2:21

αυτον και εκληθη (and he was called) – א Β A L Ψ 053 f^{1} Βyz
αυτον εκληθη (he was called) – Θ f^{13} 565
το παιδιον ωνομασθη (the child was called) – D

Luke 2:22

αὐτῶν – א, A, B, K, L, W, Δ, Θ, Ξ, Π, Ψ, 053 etc.
αυτου – D, 2174, syr^{s}, cop^{sa}
αὐτῆς – 76
omit – 435, cop^{bo}

Luke 2:27

τοὺς γονεῖς (the parents) – almost all manuscripts, including most Byzantine and Alexandrian ones
omitted by a few late Greek manuscripts, including Minuscule 245, 1347, 1510, 2643
(Joseph and Mary) – Middle English, Tuscan, and Liège Diatessarons (13th–14th century)
(they) – Venetian Diatessaron (Codex Marcianus 4975, 14th century)

Luke 2:33

καὶ ἦν ὁ πατὴρ αὐτοῦ καὶ ἡ μήτηρ θαυμάζοντες (and his father and mother were amazed) – 01, B, D, L, W, 700, Vg, cop. Alexandrian text-type: Westcott and Hort 1881, Westcott and Hort / [NA27 and UBS4 variants], 1864–94, Nestle 1904.
καὶ ἦν ὁ πατὴρ αὐτοῦ καὶ ἡ μήτηρ αὐτοῦ θαυμάζοντες (and his father and his mother were amazed) – Tischendorf 8th Edition
καὶ ἦν Ἰωσὴφ καὶ ἡ μήτηρ αὐτοῦ θαυμάζοντες (and Joseph and his mother were amazed) – A, K, X, Δ, Θ, Π, Ψ, 053, ƒ^{13}, 28, 565, ... it syr^{ph, h, pal(MSS)}, cop^{bo(MSS)}, goth, Dia. Byz: Stephanus Textus Receptus 1550, Scrivener's Textus Receptus 1894, RP Byzantine Majority Text 2005, Greek Orthodox Church.

Luke 2:38

καὶ αὐτῇ τῇ ὥρᾳ (and at that hour) – א, A, B, D, L, W, Δ, Ξ, Ψ, 0130, 28, 33
καὶ αὕτη αὐτῇ τῇ ὥρᾳ (and at that hour she) – Θ, 053, f^{1}, f^{13}, Byz

Luke 2:40

ἐκραταιοῦτο (became strong) – Alexandrian text-type
ἐκραταιοῦτο πνεύματι (became strong in spirit) – Byz

Luke 2:41

οἱ γονεῖς αὐτοῦ (his parents) – almost all manuscripts, including most Byzantine and Alexandrian ones
ὁ τε Ἰωσὴφ καὶ ἡ Μαριάμ (both Joseph and Mary) – 1012, a, b, g^{1}, 1, r^{1}, and some Diatessarons.
(his mother) – it (Old Latin) manuscripts c and ff^{2}
(his kinsfolk) – syr^{s}, syr^{p}, Arabic Diatessaron

Luke 2:42

ἀναβάντων αὐτῶν (they went up) – Alexandrian text-type
ἀναβάντων αὐτῶν εἰς Ἰεροσόλυμα (they went up to Jerusalem) – Byz

Luke 2:43

οὐκ ἔγνωσαν οἱ γονεῖς αὐτοῦ. (his parents didn't know it.) – Alexandrian text-type. 01, B, D, L, W, θ
οὐκ ἔγνω Ἰωσὴφ καὶ ἡ μήτηρ αὐτοῦ· (Joseph and his mother didn't know it.) – Byz. A, C, Ψ, 0130, ƒ^{13}, it, syr^{p, h}, cop^{bo(MSS)} E, Π, 565
(his kinfolk didn't know it.) – syr^{s}

Luke 2:48

Ἰδού, ὁ πατήρ σου κἀγὼ ὀδυνώμενοι (ἐ)ζητοῦμεν σε. (Look, your father and I have been anxiously searching you.) – almost all manuscripts, including most Byzantine and Alexandrian ones
Ἰδού, οἱ σῠγγενεῖς σου κἀγὼ ὀδυνώμενοι (ἐ)ζητοῦμεν σε. (Look, your relatives and I have been anxiously searching you.) – C^{vid}, β, ε
Οδυνώμενοι (ἐ)ζητοῦμεν σε. ([We] have been anxiously searching you.) – a, b, ff^{2}, g^{2}, 1, r^{1}
Ἰδού, ἡμεῖς ὀδυνώμενοι (ἐ)ζητοῦμεν σε. (Look, we have been anxiously searching you.) – syr^{c}

1 Textual variants in Luke 3

Luke 3:8

καὶ μὴ ἄρξησθε λέγειν ἐν ἑαυτοῖς (And do not begin to say to yourselves) – א, A, C, B [w], D, W, Δ, Ξ,

θ, K, M, N, U, Δ, Λ, Π, 33, 157, 579, 28, 565, 700, 1071, 1424, u[w]t

καὶ μὴ δόξητε λέγειν ἐν ἑαυτοῖς (And do not think to say to yourselves) – L, Ψ
καὶ μὴ δόξησθε λέγειν ἐν ἑαυτοῖς (And do not think to yourself to say to yourselves) – Γ

1 Textual variants in Luke 4

Luke 4:17

ἀνοίξας (opened) – B, A, L, W, Ξ, 33, 892, 1195, 1241, ℓ 547, syr^{s}, h, pal, cop^{sa, bo}
ἀναπτύξας (unrolled) – א, D^{c}, K, Δ, Θ, Π, Ψ, f^{1}, f^{13}, 28, 565, 700, 1009, 1010, 1071, 1079, 1216, 1230, 1242, 1253, 1344, 1546, 1646, 2148, 2174, Byz
ἁπτύξας (touched) – D*

2 Textual variants in Luke 5

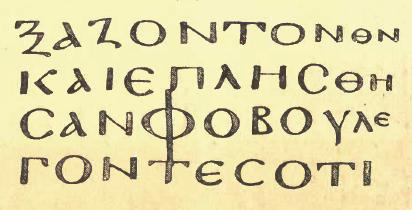
Luke 5:26 in Codex Nitriensis (Scrivener's facsimile)

Luke 5:26

και εκστασις ελαβεν απαντας και εδοξαζον τον θεον (And ecstasy took hold of them all, and they were glorifying God) – omitted by D M S W X Ψ Ω* 13 69 118 124 157 174 205 209 579 788 1241 it^{d,e}

Luke 5:39

verse omitted by D it^{mss}

1 Textual variants in Luke 6

Luke 6:4

Codex Bezae contains the following addition immediately after Luke 6:4.

Τη αυτη ημερα θεασαμενος τινα εργαζομενον τω σαββατω ειπεν αυτω ανθρωπε, ει μεν οιδας τι ποιεις, μακαριος ει ει δε μη οιδας, επικαταρατος και παραβατης ει του νομου. – D
Eodem die videns quendam operantem sabbato et dixit illi: Homo, siquidem scis, quod facis, beatus es, si autem nescis, maledictus et trabaricator legis. – d
On that same day, seeing someone working on the Sabbath, he (Jesus) said to him, "Man, if you know what you do, blessed are you; but if you do not know, you are cursed and a transgressor of the law."

2 Textual variants in Luke 7

Luke 7:7

διο ουδε εμαυτον ηξιωσα προς σε ελθειν (For this reason I did not deem myself worthy to come to you) – omitted by D 700* it^{mss} syr^{s}

Luke 7:13

ο Ιησους (Jesus) – D W f^{1} 700 1241 it^{f} vg^{mss} syr^{s,p} co^{bo}
ο κυριος (the lord) – rell

8 Textual variants in Luke 8

Luke 8:26

Γερασηνων (Gerasenes) – 𝔓^{75} B D 0267 latt co^{sa,bo^{ms}}
Γεργεσηνων (Gergesenes) – א L X Θ Ξ f^{1} 22 33 157 579 700* 1241 1342 syr^{pal} co^{bo} arm geo Eusebius Epiphanius
Γαδαρηνων (Gadarenes) – A R W Δ Ψ 0135 f^{13} 700^{c} 1071 Byz syr goth

Luke 8:43

ιατροις προσαναλωσασα ολον τομ βιον (and had spent all her living upon physicians) – omitted by 𝔓^{75} B (D) 0279 syr^{s,pal} co^{sa} arm geo Origen. Generally omitted by Alexandrian text-type, but included by Byzantine text-type. Most scholars think that inclusions of this phrase in later manuscripts are probably a result of harmonisation attempts with Mark 5:26 rather than a Lukan rewriting of the Markan original, especially because προσαναλωσασα is a hapax legomenon.
εἰς ἰατρούς προσαναλωσασα ολον τομ βιον (and had spent all her living to(wards) physicians) – Stephanus Textus Receptus 1550, Scrivener's Textus Receptus 1894

Luke 8:43

ἀπ’ οὐδενὸς ap’ oudenos ((away) from / because of no one) – Alexandrian text-type.
ὑπ’ οὐδενὸς hup’ oudenos (under(neath) / by / through no one) – Byzantine text-type.

Luke 8:45

εἶπεν ὁ Πέτρος Ἐπιστάτα, οἱ ὄχλοι συνέχουσίν σε καὶ ἀποθλίβουσιν. (Peter said: 'Master, the people are crowding and pressing against you'.) – Alexandrian text-type.
εἶπεν ὁ Πέτρος Ἐπιστάτα, οἱ ὄχλοι συνέχουσίν σε καὶ ἀποθλίβουσιν. (Peter and those beside him said: 'Master, the people are crowding and pressing against you'.) – Tischendorf 8th Edition
εἴπεν ὁ Πέτρος καὶ οἱ μετ’ αὐτοῦ, Ἐπιστάτα, οἱ ὄχλοι συνέχουσίν σε καὶ ἀποθλίβουσιν, καὶ λέγεις, Tίς ὁ ἁψάμενός μου; (Peter and those with him said: 'Master, the people are crowding and pressing against you, and you say: "Who touched me?"') – Byzantine text-type.

Luke 8:48

Θυγάτηρ, ("Daughter,...") – Alexandrian text-type.
Θάρσει, θύγατερ, ("Courage, daughter,...") – Byzantine text-type.

Luke 8:49

μηκέτι σκύλλε τὸν διδάσκαλον ("... do not trouble the teacher anymore.") – Alexandrian text-type.
μὴ σκύλλε τὸν διδάσκαλον ("... do not trouble the teacher.") – Byzantine text-type.

Luke 8:51

οὐκ ἀφῆκεν εἰσελθεῖν τινα σὺν αὐτῷ εἰ μὴ Πέτρον καὶ Ἰωάνην καὶ Ἰάκωβον (he did not allow anybody to enter with him if not Peter and John and James) – Alexandrian text-type.
οὐκ ἀφῆκεν εἰσελθεῖν οὐδένα, εἰ μὴ Πέτρον καὶ Ἰάκωβον καὶ Ἰωάννην, (he did not allow nobody to enter if not Peter and James and John) – Byzantine text-type.

Luke 8:54

αὐτὸς δὲ κρατήσας τῆς χειρὸς αὐτῆς (But he took her by the hand) – Alexandrian text-type.
αὐτὸς δὲ ἐκβαλὼν ἔξω πάντας, καὶ κρατήσας τῆς χειρὸς αὐτῆς (But he put them all outside, and took her by the hand) – Byzantine text-type.

3 Textual variants in Luke 9

Luke 9:35

ἐκλελεγμένος (Elect One) – 𝔓^{45} 𝔓^{75} א B L Ξ 892 1241 a aur ff^{2} l vgst syr^{s}
εκλεκτος (elected) – Θ f^{1} 1365
αγαπητος (beloved) – A C K P W X Δ Π f^{13} 28 33 565 700 Byz Marcion
αγαπητος εν ο ευδοκησα (beloved one in whom I am well-pleased) – C^{3} D Ψ ℓ 19 ℓ 31 ℓ 47 ℓ 48 ℓ 49 ℓ 49^{m} ℓ 183 ℓ 183^{m} ℓ 211^{m}

Luke 9:54

, ὡς καὶ Ἠλίας ἐποίησε(ν); (", just like Elias did?") – Byz: Stephanus Textus Receptus 1550, Scrivener's Textus Receptus 1894, RP Byzantine Majority Text 2005, Greek Orthodox Church
omitted by Alexandrian text-type: Westcott and Hort 1881, Westcott and Hort / [NA27 and UBS4 variants], Tischendorf 8th Edition 1864–94, Nestle 1904

Luke 9:55–56

στραφεις δε επετιμησεν αυτοις (but He turned and rebuked them) – 𝔓^{45} 𝔓^{75} א B C L W X Δ Ξ Ψ 28 33 565 892 1009 1010 1071 Byz^{pt} Lect
στραφεις δε επετιμησεν αυτοις και ειπεν, Ουκ οιδατε ποιου πνευματος εστε (but He turned and rebuked them and He said: "You do not know what manner of spirit you are of) – D (ℓ 1127^{m}) d geo
στραφεις δε επετιμησεν αυτοις καὶ εἶπεν, Οὑκ οἴδατε οἵου πνεύματος ἑστε ὐμεῖς; ὀ γὰρ υἰὸς τοῦ ἁνθρώπου οὑκ ἦλθεν ψυχὰς ἁνθρώπων ἁπολέσαι ἁλλὰ σῶσαι (but He turned and rebuked them and He said: "You do not know what manner of spirit you are of; for the Son of man came not to destroy men's lives, but to save them) – K Π 1079 1242 1546 (f^{1} omit γαρ) (Θ f^{13} omit υμεις and γαρ)

1 Textual variants in Luke 10

Luke 10:41–42

instead μεριμνας και θορυβαζη περι πολλα, ολιγων (ενος) δε εστιν χρεια Μαριαμ γαρ (you are worried and being troubled about many things Miriam, but not much (one thing) is needed) has only θορυβαζη (you are being troubled) with (D has also Μαριὰμ Miriam) (a, b, d, e, ff^{2}, i, l, r^{1}, syr^{s}, Ambrose omit θορυβαζη)

2 Textual variants in Luke 11

Luke 11:2

ἐλθέτω τὸ πνεῦμα σου τὸ ἄγιον εφ ημας και καθαρισατω ημας (May your Holy Spirit come upon us and purify us) – 162, 700
ἐφ ἡμᾶς ἐλθέτω σου ἡ βασιλεία (let thine kingdom come upon us) – D, it^{d}
ἐλθέτω ἡ βασιλεία σου (May your kingdom come) – A, B, K, L, X, Θ, Π, Ψ, f^{1}, 28, 33, (565, 1253), 892, 1009, 1010, 1071, 1079, 1195, 1216, 1230, 1242, 1344, 1365, 1546, 1646, 2148, 2174, Byz, Lect, ℓ 69, ℓ 185, ℓ 1127, it, vg, syr, cop^{sa, bo}, arm, geo, Origen
ἐλθάτω ἡ βασιλεία σου (May your kingdom come) – C, P, W, Δ, f^{13}, 1241, (𝔓^{45} indistinguishable ἐλθάτω or ἐλθέτω)
omit – geo

Luke 11:13

πνευμα αγιον – 𝔓^{75}, א, B, C, K, W, X, Δ, Π, Ψ, f^{1}, f^{13}, 28
πνευμα αγαθον – L 1230 1253 1646, ℓ 4, ℓ 12, ℓ 15, ℓ 19, ℓ 69, ℓ 185, ℓ 211
δοματα αγαθα – Θ, ℓ 32^{m}

2 Textual variants in Luke 12

Luke 12:14

κριτὴν ἢ μεριστήν (judge or divider) – 𝔓^{75}, א, B, L, 0191, f^{1}, f^{13}, 33, 700, 892, 1241, cop^{sa}^{^{mss}}
δικαστὴν ἢ μεριστήν (judge or divider) – A, K, W, X, Δ, Θ, Π, Ψ, 565, 1009, 1010, 1071, 1079, 1195, 1216, 1230, 1242, 1253, 1344, 1365, 1546, 1646, 2148, 2174, Byz
μεριστὴν ἢ δικαστήν (divider or judge) – 472, ℓ 1642, eth
κριτὴν ἢ δικαστήν (divider or judge) – 69
ἄρχοντα καὶ δικαστήν (ruler and judge) – 157
κριτήν (judge) – D, it^{(a), c, d}
δικαστήν (judge) – 28
μεριστήν (divider) – cop^{sa}^{^{mss}}

Luke 12:21

verse omitted by – D, a, b, d

1 Textual variants in Luke 13

Luke 13:31

Ἐν αὐτῇ τῇ ὥρᾳ (At that very hour / In the same hour / Just at that time / At that same time) – Alexandrian text-type.
Ἐν αὐτῇ τῇ ἡμέρᾳ (On that very day / (On) the same day) – Byzantine text-type.

1 Textual variants in Luke 14

Luke 14:5

υἱὸς ἢ βοῦς – 𝔓^{45}, 𝔓^{75}, B, W, Δ, 28, 565, 700
υἱὸς ὑμῶν – 1344, ℓ 184, ℓ 1579
ὄνος ἢ βοῦς – א, K, L, X, Π, Ψ, f^{1}, f^{13}, 33, 892, 1071, ℓ 547
ὄνος υἱὸς ἢ βοῦς – Θ
πρόβατον ἢ βοῦς – D
υἱὸς ἢ βοῦς ἢ ὄνος – 2174, syr^{c}

3 Textual variants in Luke 15

Luke 15:16

καὶ ἐπεθύμει γεμίσαι τὴν κοιλίαν αὐτοῦ ἐκ τῶν κερατίων (And he longed to fill his stomach out of the pods) – Nestle 1904.
καὶ ἐπεθύμει χορτασθῆναι ἐκ τῶν κερατίων (And he longed to feed out of the pods) – Westcott and Hort 1881, Westcott and Hort / [NA27 and UBS4 variants]
καὶ ἐπεθύμει γεμίσαι τὴν κοιλίαν αὐτοῦ ἀπὸ τῶν κερατίων (And he longed to fill his stomach from the pods) – Byzantine text-type.

Luke 15:21

ποίησον με ὡς ἕνα τῶν μισθίων σου. (Make me as one of your hired servants) – Westcott and Hort 1881, Westcott and Hort / [NA27 and UBS4 variants]
omitted by Byzantine text-type, and other Alexandrian mss

Luke 15:23

φέρετε (having brought [imperfect]) – 𝔓75 א B L 579 1241 pc WH; Alexandrian text-type.
ἐνέγκαντες (bring [imperative]) – ἐνέγκαντες A W Θ Ψ f1 f13 ς Byz
ἐνέγκαντε (bring [imperative]) – D 1424 pc

1 Textual variants in Luke 16

Luke 16:21

ἀπὸ τῶν πιπτόντων ἀπὸ τῆς τραπέζης (from the fallings from the table) – Alexandrian text-type.
ἀπὸ τῶν ψιχίων τῶν πιπτόντων ἀπὸ τῆς τραπέζης (from the crumbs of the fallings from the table) – Byzantine text-type.

7 Textual variants in Luke 17

Luke 17:3

ἁμάρτῃ ὁ ἀδελφός σου (Should a brother of yours sin...) – א A B L W f^{1} 205 892 1071 1241 it^{a} it^{aur} it^{b} it^{f} it^{ff2} it^{i} it^{l} it^{λ} vg^{ww} vg^{st} syr^{c} syr^{s} syr^{p} syr^{h} syr^{pal} cop^{sa} cop^{bo} arm geo^{1} slav Clement Basil WH NR CEI Riv NM
ἐὰν ἁμάρτῃ ὁ ἀδελφός σου (If a brother of yours should sin...) – WH NR CEI ND Riv TILC Nv NM Alexandrian text-type.
ἐὰν δὲ ἁμάρτῃ εἰς σὲ ὁ ἀδελφός σου (But/and if a brother of yours should sin against you...) – Byzantine text-type.

ἐὰν δὲ ἁμάρτῃ (But/and if ... should sin...) – Byz ς Dio
ἁμάρτῃ εἰς σὲ (...should sin against you...) – E F G H N Ψ 28 157 180 565 579 597 700 1006 1010 1243 1292 1342 1424 1505 Byz Lect^{pt} l^{AD} it^{c} it^{d} it^{e} it^{q} it^{r1} vg^{cl} cop^{bo(mss)} eth geo^{2} Ambrose Augustine ς ND Dio TILC Nv
ἁμαρτήσῃ εἰς σὲ (...should sin against you...) – D Δ f^{13} Lect^{pt}

ἁμαρτήσῃ (should sin) – Θ
Lacune in minuscule 472, α 1386

Luke 17:4

ἑπτάκις ἐπιστρέψῃ πρὸς σὲ (seven times should return to you) – א B D L Ψ (2542) 579 892 1241 al it vg syr Clement WH; Alexandrian text-type.
ἑπτάκις τῆς ἡμέρας ἐπιστρέψῃ (seven times in a day should return) – W Θ f^{13} Byz vg syr^{p} syr^{h} cop^{sa} cop^{bo(pt)} ND Dio TILC Nv
ἑπτάκις τῆς ἡμέρας ἐπιστρέψῃ πρὸς σὲ (seven times in a day should return to you) – A f^{1}
ἑπτάκις τῆς ἡμέρας ἐπιστρέψῃ ἐπὶ σὲ (seven times in a day should return before you) – ς

Luke 17:9

οὐ δοκῶ. (I think not. or I don't think so.) – Byzantine text-type.
omitted by Alexandrian text-type.

Luke 17:11

διὰ μέσον (through/among [the] middle of/between/amidst [accusative]) – 𝔓^{75vid} א B L 579 1424 pc WH
διὰ μέσου (through/amidst/between/along [the] middle of/between/amidst [genitive]) – A W Θ Ψ 33 Byz ς
ἀνὰ μέσον (up(wards)/along/throughout/up to [the] middle of/between/amidst [accusative]) – f^{1} f^{13} 2542 Titus-Bostra
μέσον ([the] middle of/between/amidst [accusative]) – D

Luke 17:24

ἐκ τῆς ὑπὸ τὸν οὐρανὸν εἰς τὴν ὑπ’ οὐρανὸν. (literally from the under the sky to the under sky) – Alexandrian text-type, Stephanus Textus Receptus 1550, Scrivener's Textus Receptus 1894.
ἐκ τῆς ὑπ’ οὐρανὸν εἰς τὴν ὑπ’ οὐρανὸν (literally from the under sky to the under sky) – RP Byzantine Majority Text 2005.
ἐκ τῆς ὑπ’ οὐρανὸν (literally from the under sky) – Greek Orthodox Church.

Luke 17:24

ὁ υἱὸς τοῦ ἀνθρώπου ἐν τῇ ἡμέρᾳ αὐτοῦ (the Son of Man in his day) – א A E G H K L W X Δ Θ Π Ψ 063 f^{1} f^{13} 28 180 205 565 579 597 700 892 1006 1009 1010 1071 1079 1195 1216 1230 1241 1242 1243 1253 1292 1342 1344 1365 1424 1505 1546 1646 2148 2174 Byz Lect it^{aur} it^{q} it^{r1} vg (syr^{c}) (syr^{s}) syr^{p} syr^{h} cop^{bo} goth arm geo slav (NA [ἐν τῇ ἡμέρᾳ αὐτοῦ]) NR CEI Riv TILC Nv
καὶ ὁ υἱὸς τοῦ ἀνθρώπου ἐν τῇ ἡμέρᾳ αὐτοῦ (and the Son of Man in his day) – N 157 ℓ76 ℓ950 ℓ1127 ς ND Dio
ἡ παρουσια τοῦ υἱοῦ τοῦ ἀνθρώπου (the Second Coming of the Son of Man) – it^{c} (it^{l}) it^{s} cop^{bo(ms)} eth Ambrose Maximus (see Matt. 24:27)
ἡ παρουσια τοῦ υἱοῦ τοῦ ἀνθρώπου ἐν τῇ ἡμέρᾳ αὐτοῦ (the Second Coming of the Son of Man in his day) – it^{f} Vigilius
ὁ υἱὸς τοῦ ἀνθρώπου (the Son of Man) – 𝔓^{75} B (D it^{b} it^{d} it^{e} it^{i} καὶ ὁ) it^{a} cop^{sa} WH NM.

Luke 17:36 (see Matt. 24:40)

verse omitted by א, A, B, K, L, W, X, Δ, Θ, Π, Ψ, 063, f^{1}, 28, 33, 565, 892, 1009, 1010, 1079, 1195, 1216, 1242, 1365, Byz, ℓ 184, ℓ 950, cop^{sa, bo}, goth, eth
δύο ἐν ἀγρῷ εἷς παραλημφθήσεται καὶ ὁ ἕτερος ἀφεθήσεται (two in the field; one will be taken and the other left) – D, 1071, 1230, 2174, ℓ 185, ℓ 1579, it, vg, syr, arm, geo, Diatessaron^{a, i, n}
δύο ἔσονται ἐν τῷ ἀγρῷ εἷς παραλημφθήσεται καὶ ὁ ἕτερος ἀφεθήσεται (two men will be in the field; one will be taken and the other left) – 700, 1253, 1344
δύο ἔσονται ἐν ἀγρῷ εἷς παραλημφθήσεται καὶ ὁ ἕτερος ἀφεθήσεται (two men will be in the field; one will be taken and the other left) – 1646
δύο ἔσονται ἐν ἀγρῷ εἷς παραλημφθήσεται, ἡ δὲ ἑτέρα ἀφεθήσεται (two will be in the field then; one will be taken, but the other left) – f^{13}

3 Textual variants in Luke 18

Luke 18:20

μητέρα (mother) – A B D K L P W Θ Ψ 078 f^{1} 33 892 1241 2542 al it vg syr^{h} WH
μητέρα σου (your mother) – א f^{13} Byz it^{a} it^{b} it^{c} vg^{mss} syr^{s} syr^{c} syr^{p} ς

Luke 18:24

Ἰδὼν δὲ αὐτὸν ὁ Ἰησοῦς εἶπεν (And having seen him, Jesus said) – א (B omitted ὁ) L f^{1} 157 205 579 1241 2542 syr^{pal} cop^{sa} cop^{bo} geo (WH [ὁ]) CEI NM
Ἰδὼν δὲ αὐτὸν ὁ Ἰησοῦς περίλυπον γενόμενον εἶπεν (And having seen him, Jesus became sad, and said or And having seen that he became sad, Jesus said; see Luke 18:23) – A E F G H K N P W X Δ Θ Π Ψ 078 f^{13} 28 33^{vid} 180 565 597 700 892 1006 1009 1010 1071 1079 1195 1216 1230 1242 1243 1253 1292 1342 1344 1365 (1424 ὁ Ἰησοῦς περίλυπον αὐτὸν) 1505 1546 1646 2148 2174 Byz Lect (ℓ 1016 ℓ 1627 omitted αὐτὸν) it^{a} it^{aur} (it^{f}) it^{q} vg syr^{h} goth (arm) (eth^{TH}) slav (Diatessaron^{syr} arm) ς (NA [περίλυπον γενόμενον]) (NR [περίλυπον γενόμενον]) ND (Riv) Dio TILC Nv
Ἰδὼν δὲ ὁ Ἰησοῦς αὐτὸν περίλυπον γενόμενον εἶπεν (And Jesus, having seen that he became sad, said) – syr^{c} syr^{s} syr^{p}
Ἰδὼν δὲ αὐτὸν περίλυπον γενόμενον εἶπεν ὁ Ἰησοῦς (And having seen that he became sad, said Jesus) – D it^{b} it^{c} it^{d} (it^{e}) it^{ff2} it^{i} it^{l} it^{r1} eth^{pp}

Luke 18:35

ἐπαιτῶν (begging; asking alms) – א B (D) L T 579 pc WH
προσαιτῶν (begging; asking for in addition) – A W Θ Ψ f^{1} f^{13} 33^{vid} Byz ς

1 Textual variants in Luke 19

Luke 19:5

ὁ Ἰησοῦς εἶπεν πρὸς αὐτόν (Jesus said to him) – א B L T Θ f^{1} 579 1241 2542 pc syr^{s} syr^{c} syr^{p} cop WH NR CEI Riv TILC Nv NM
ὁ Ἰησοῦς εἴδεν αὐτόν, καὶ εἴπεν πρὸς αὐτόν (Jesus saw him, and said to him) – A (D) W (Ψ) f^{13} 33^{vid} Byz it vg syr^{h} ς ND Dio

3 Textual variants in Luke 20

Luke 20:1

μιᾷ τῶν ἡμερῶν (one of the days) – א B D L Q Ψ f^{1} 579 1241 2542 pc it vg syr^{s} syr^{c} syr^{p} (cop^{sa}) cop^{bo} WH CEI TILC Nv
μιᾷ τῶν ἡμερῶν ἐκείνων (one of those days) – A C W Θ f^{13} 33 Byz syr^{h} ς NR ND Riv Dio NM

Luke 20:1

ἀρχιερεῖς (chief priests) – א B C D L N Q Θ Ψ f^{1} (f^{13}) 33 579 892 1241 1424 2542 al it vg syr cop ς WH
ἱερεῖς (priests) – A W Byz

Luke 20:9

ἄνθρωπός ἐφύτευσεν ἀμπελῶνα (a man planted a vineyard) – א B E G H K L N Q Δ Π Ψ f^{1} 28 33 180 205 565 579 597 700 892 1006 1009 1010 1079 1216 1230 1242 1243 1253 1292 1342 1424 1546 1646 2174 Byz it^{aur} it^{f} vg cop^{sa} cop^{bo} goth eth slav Origen Augustine WH
ἄνθρωπός τις ἐφύτευσεν ἀμπελῶνα (a certain man planted a vineyard) – A W Θ f^{13} 157 1071 1195 1241 1344 1365 1505 2148 2542 (it^{r1}) vg^{si} vg^{mss} syr^{c} syr^{s} syr^{p} syr^{h} arm geo (Diatessaron^{arm}) Cyril^{lem} Theodoret Ps-Athanasius ς (NA [τις])
ἀμπελῶνα ἐφύτευσεν ἄνθρωπός (a vineyard planted a man) – D it^{a} it^{c} it^{d} it^{e} it^{ff2} it^{i} it^{l} it^{q} vg^{ms} Ambrose
ἄνθρωπός ἐφύτευσεν (a man planted) – C

0 Textual variants in Luke 21

Luke 21:1

4 Textual variants in Luke 22

Luke 22:19b-20

τὸ ὑπὲρ ὑμῶν διδόμενον... τὸ ὑπὲρ ὑμῶν ἐκχυννόμενον (which is given for you... which is shed for you), omitted by D, a, (b, e have a different word order) d, ff^{2}, i, l (syr^{cur} omits only τὸ ὑπὲρ ὑμῶν ἐκχυννόμενον)

Luke 22:34

ἕως τρίς με ἀπαρνήσῃ μὴ εἰδέναι (until three times me you will deny to not know) – Nestle 1904
ἕως τρίς με ἀπαρνήσῃ εἰδέναι (until three times me you will deny to know) – Westcott and Hort 1881
πρὶν ἢ τρὶς ἀπαρνήσῃ μὴ εἰδέναι με (before the three times you will deny not to know me) – Byz

Luke 22:43-44

Luke 22:62

verse omitted by a, b, e, ff^{2}, i, l, r^{1} (0171 does not appear to leave space)

13 Textual variants in Luke 23

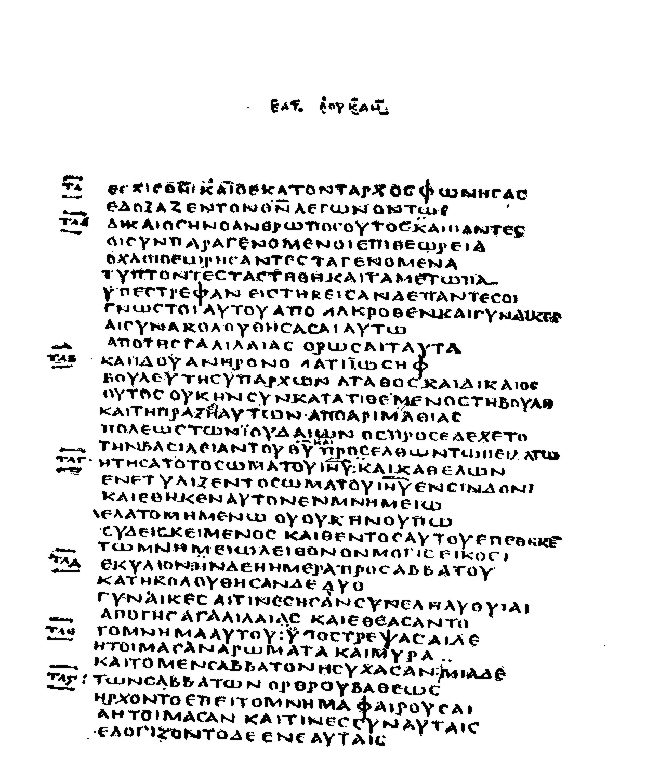
Codex Bezae, contains text Luke 23:47-24:1 (paraphrastic)

Luke 23:6

Πειλᾶτος δὲ ἀκούσας (when Pilate heard) – Alexandrian text-type: Westcott and Hort 1881, Westcott and Hort / [NA27 and UBS4 variants], 1864–94, Tischendorf 8th Edition, Nestle 1904
Πιλάτος δὲ ἀκούσας Γαλιλαίαν (when Pilate heard of Galilee) – Byz: Stephanus Textus Receptus 1550, Scrivener's Textus Receptus 1894, RP Byzantine Majority Text 2005, Greek Orthodox Church

Luke 23:8

διὰ τὸ ἀκούειν περὶ αὐτοῦ (because of hearing about him) – Alexandrian text-type: Westcott and Hort 1881, Westcott and Hort / [NA27 and UBS4 variants], 1864–94, Tischendorf 8th Edition, Nestle 1904
διὰ τὸ ἀκούειν πολλὰ περὶ αὐτοῦ (because of hearing a lot about him) – Byz: Stephanus Textus Receptus 1550, Scrivener's Textus Receptus 1894, RP Byzantine Majority Text 2005, Greek Orthodox Church

Luke 23:17

omitted – Alexandrian text-type: Westcott and Hort 1881, Westcott and Hort / [NA27 and UBS4 variants], 1864–94, Tischendorf 8th Edition, Nestle 1904
ἀνάγκην δὲ εἶχεν ἀπολύειν αὐτοῖς κατὰ ἑορτὴν ἕνα. (for it was necessary for him to release one to them at the feast) – Byz: Stephanus Textus Receptus 1550, Scrivener's Textus Receptus 1894, RP Byzantine Majority Text 2005, Greek Orthodox Church

Luke 23:19

βληθεὶς ἐν τῇ φυλακῇ (having been thrown into the prison) – Alexandrian text-type: Westcott and Hort 1881, Westcott and Hort / [NA27 and UBS4 variants], 1864–94, Tischendorf 8th Edition, Nestle 1904
βεβλημένος εἰς φυλακὴν (had been thrown into prison) – Byz: Stephanus Textus Receptus 1550, Scrivener's Textus Receptus 1894, RP Byzantine Majority Text 2005
βεβλημένος εἰς τὴν φυλακὴν (had been thrown into the prison) – Greek Orthodox Church

Luke 23:21

Σταύρου, σταύρου αὐτόν (Crucify, crucify him! [imperative singular]) – Alexandrian text-type: Westcott and Hort 1881, Westcott and Hort / [NA27 and UBS4 variants], 1864–94, Tischendorf 8th Edition, Nestle 1904
Σταύρωσον, σταύρωσον αὐτόν (Crucify, crucify him! [imperative plural]) – Byz: Stephanus Textus Receptus 1550, Scrivener's Textus Receptus 1894, RP Byzantine Majority Text 2005, Greek Orthodox Church

Luke 23:22

οὐδὲν αἴτιον (no cause/reason/fault/guilt) – Alexandrian text-type: Westcott and Hort 1881, Westcott and Hort / [NA27 and UBS4 variants], 1864–94, Tischendorf 8th Edition, Nestle 1904. Byz: Stephanus Textus Receptus 1550, Scrivener's Textus Receptus 1894, RP Byzantine Majority Text 2005.
οὐδὲν ἄξιον (not worthy/deserving/fit) – Greek Orthodox Church

Luke 23:23

αἱ φωναὶ αὐτῶν (the voices of them) – Alexandrian text-type: Westcott and Hort 1881, Westcott and Hort / [NA27 and UBS4 variants], 1864–94, Tischendorf 8th Edition, Nestle 1904
αἱ φωναὶ αὐτῶν καὶ τῶν ἀρχιερέων (the voices of them and of the chief priests) – Byz: Stephanus Textus Receptus 1550, Scrivener's Textus Receptus 1894, RP Byzantine Majority Text 2005, Greek Orthodox Church

Luke 23:25

ἀπέλυσεν δὲ τὸν (then he released the [one]) – Alexandrian text-type: Westcott and Hort 1881, Westcott and Hort / [NA27 and UBS4 variants], 1864–94, Tischendorf 8th Edition, Nestle 1904
ἀπέλυσε δὲ αὐτοῖς τὸν (then he released to them the [one]) – Byz: Stephanus Textus Receptus 1550, Scrivener's Textus Receptus 1894, RP Byzantine Majority Text 2005
ἀπέλυσε δὲ αὐτοῖς τὸν Βαραββᾶν τὸν (then he released to them Barabbas, the [one]) – Greek Orthodox Church

Luke 23:35

οἱ ἄρχοντες (the rulers) – Alexandrian text-type: Westcott and Hort 1881, Westcott and Hort / [NA27 and UBS4 variants], 1864–94, Tischendorf 8th Edition, Nestle 1904
οἱ ἄρχοντες σὺν αὐτοῖς (the rulers with them) – Byz: Stephanus Textus Receptus 1550, Scrivener's Textus Receptus 1894, RP Byzantine Majority Text 2005, Greek Orthodox Church

Luke 23:38

ἦν δὲ καὶ ἐπιγραφὴ ἐπ’ αὐτῷ· ὁ βασιλεὺς τῶν Ἰουδαίων οὗτος. (There was also an inscription above him: "The king of the Jews, this [is].") – Alexandrian text-type: Westcott and Hort 1881, Westcott and Hort / [NA27 and UBS4 variants], 1864–94, Tischendorf 8th Edition, Nestle 1904
ἦν δὲ καὶ ἐπιγραφὴ γεγραμμένη ἐπ’ αὐτῷ γράμμασιν Ἑλληνικοῖς καὶ Ρωμαϊκοῖς καὶ Ἑβραϊκοῖς, Οὗτός ἐστιν ὁ βασιλεὺς τῶν Ἰουδαίων. (There was also an inscription written above him in Greek and Latin and Hebrew letters: "This is the king of the Jews.") – Byz: Stephanus Textus Receptus 1550, Scrivener's Textus Receptus 1894, RP Byzantine Majority Text 2005, Greek Orthodox Church

Luke 23:39

Οὐχὶ σὺ εἶ ὁ Χριστός; σῶσον σεαυτὸν καὶ ἡμᾶς. (Are you not the Christ/Messiah? Save yourself and us!) – Alexandrian text-type: Westcott and Hort 1881, Westcott and Hort / [NA27 and UBS4 variants], 1864–94, Tischendorf 8th Edition, Nestle 1904
Εἰ σὺ εἶ ὁ Χριστός, σῶσον σεαυτὸν καὶ ἡμᾶς. (If you are the Christ/Messiah, save yourself and us!) – Byz: Stephanus Textus Receptus 1550, Scrivener's Textus Receptus 1894, RP Byzantine Majority Text 2005, Greek Orthodox Church

Luke 23:42

καὶ ἔλεγεν Ἰησοῦ, μνήσθητί μου (And he said: "Jesus, remember me..." or And he said to Jesus: "Remember me...") – Alexandrian text-type: Westcott and Hort 1881, Westcott and Hort / [NA27 and UBS4 variants], 1864–94, Nestle 1904
καὶ ἔλεγεν· Ἰησοῦ, μνήσθητί μου (And he said: "Jesus, remember me..."') – Tischendorf 8th Edition
Καὶ ἔλεγεν τῷ Ἰησοῦ,/· Μνήσθητί μου, κύριε/Κύριε, (And he said to Jesus: "Remember me, Lord/lord,..."') – Byz: Stephanus Textus Receptus 1550, Scrivener's Textus Receptus 1894, RP Byzantine Majority Text 2005, Greek Orthodox Church

Luke 23:45

τοῦ ἡλίου ἐκλιπόντος (the sun ended/failed/ceased/left out) – Alexandrian text-type: Westcott and Hort 1881, Westcott and Hort / [NA27 and UBS4 variants], 1864–94, Nestle 1904. Greek Orthodox Church (Luke 23:44).
καὶ ἐσκοτίσθη ὁ ἥλιος (and the sun darkened) – Byz: Stephanus Textus Receptus 1550, Scrivener's Textus Receptus 1894, RP Byzantine Majority Text 2005

19 Textual variants in Luke 24

Luke 24:1

ἐπὶ τὸ μνημειον ἦλθον (to the memorial/monument they went) – 𝔓^{75} א C* Δ al Eusebius
ἐπὶ τὸ μνῆμα ἦλθον (to the memory they went) – Alexandrian text-type: Westcott and Hort 1881, Westcott and Hort / [NA27 and UBS4 variants], 1864–94, Nestle 1904
ἦλθον ἐπὶ τὸ μνῆμα (they went to the memory) – ς, Byz: Stephanus Textus Receptus 1550, Scrivener's Textus Receptus 1894, RP Byzantine Majority Text 2005, Greek Orthodox Church

Luke 24:1

ἀρώματα (spices) – 𝔓^{75} א B C* L 33 pc l^{844} it vg cop^{bo(pt)} WH NR CEI Riv TILC Nv NM. Alexandrian text-type: Westcott and Hort 1881, Westcott and Hort / [NA27 and UBS4 variants], 1864–94, Nestle 1904
ἀρώματα καί τινες σὺν αὐταῖς (spices and certain others with her) – A C W Θ Ψ f^{1}, f^{13}, Byz, it^{f} it^{q} it^{r1} (syr cop^{bo(pt)}) ς ND Dio. Byz: Stephanus Textus Receptus 1550, Scrivener's Textus Receptus 1894, RP Byzantine Majority Text 2005, Greek Orthodox Church
ἀρώματα. ἐλογίζοντο δὲ ἐν ἑαυταῖς, τίς ἄρα ἀποκυλίσει τὸν λίθον. [2] ἐλθοῦσαι δὲ εὗρον (...spices. And they were thinking to themselves: "So, who will roll the stone away?" [2] But as they were coming... see Mark 16:3) – D (070 it^{c}) it^{d} cop^{sa}

Luke 24:3

τοῦ κυρίου Ἰησοῦ (of the Lord Jesus) – 𝔓^{75}, א, A, B, C, K, L, W, X, Δ, Θ, Π, Ψ, 0124, f^{1}, f^{13}, 28, 33, 565, 700, 892, 1009, 1010, Byz, Lect, it^{aur, c, f, q}, vg
του Ιησου (Jesus) – 579, 1071, 1241, syr^{cur}
omitted by D, a, b, d, e, ff^{2}, l, r^{1}

Luke 24:6

οὐκ ἔστιν ὢδε, ἀλλ(ὰ) ἠγέρθη (He is not here, but is risen), omitted by D, a, b, d, e, ff^{2}, l, r^{1}, arm^{mss}, geo^{B}

Luke 24:9

απο του μνημειου (from the tomb), omitted by D, a, b, c, d, e, ff^{2}, l, r^{1}, arm, geo

Luke 24:12

verse omitted by D, a, b, d, e, l, r^{1}

Luke 24:13

ἑξήκοντα (sixty) – 𝔓^{75} A B D E F G H K^{2} L W X Δ Ψ 063 070 f1 f13 28 33vid 157 180 205 565 579 597 700 892 1006 1009 1010 1071 1079^{c} 1195 1216 1230 1241 1242 1243 1253 1292 1342 1344 1365 1424 1505 1546 1646 2148 2174 Byz Lect it^{a} it^{aur} it^{b} it^{c} it^{d} it^{f} it^{ff2} it^{l} vg syr^{c} syr^{s} syr^{p} syr^{h} cop^{sa} cop^{bo} eth slav Augustine ς WH
ἑκατόν ἑξήκοντα (hundred sixty) – א K* N^{vid} Θ Π 079 1079* pc l^{844} l^{2211} vg^{mss} syr^{pal} arm geo Eusebius Jerome Sozomen
ἑπτὰ (seven) – it^{e}

Luke 24:17

περιπατοῦντες; καὶ ἐστάθησαν σκυθρωποί. ("...as you are walking?" They stood still, looking sad.) – Alexandrian text-type: Westcott and Hort 1881, Westcott and Hort / [NA27 and UBS4 variants], 1864–94, Tischendorf 8th Edition, Nestle 1904
περιπατοῦντες, καί ἐστε σκυθρωποί; ("...as you are walking and are sad?") – Byz: Stephanus Textus Receptus 1550, Scrivener's Textus Receptus 1894, RP Byzantine Majority Text 2005, Greek Orthodox Church

Luke 24:26

δοξαν – majority of mss
βασιλειαν – 𝔓^{75}

Luke 24:36

omitted – Alexandrian text-type: Westcott and Hort 1881, Westcott and Hort / [NA27 and UBS4 variants] 1864–94, Tischendorf 8th Edition, Nestle 1904
ὁ Ἰησοῦς (Jesus) – Byz: Stephanus Textus Receptus 1550, Scrivener's Textus Receptus 1894, RP Byzantine Majority Text 2005, Greek Orthodox Church

Luke 24:36

καὶ λέγει αὐτοῖς εἰρήνη ὑμῖν (and said to them: Peace unto you) – mss of Alexandrian, Casarean, and Byzantine text-types. Westcott and Hort 1881, Westcott and Hort / [NA27 and UBS4 variants] 1864–94, Nestle 1904 (between brackets), Stephanus Textus Receptus 1550, Scrivener's Textus Receptus 1894, RP Byzantine Majority Text 2005, Greek Orthodox Church
omitted – D, a, b, d, e, ff^{2}, l, r^{1}. Tischendorf 8th Edition

Luke 24:40

καὶ τοῦτο εἰπὼν ἔδειξεν αὐτοῖς τὰς χειρᾶς καὶ τοὺς πόδας (and having said thus, [he] showed to them the hands and the feet) – Alexandrian text-type: Westcott and Hort 1881, Westcott and Hort / [NA27 and UBS4 variants] 1864–94, Nestle 1904 (between brackets)
καὶ τοῦτο εἰπὼν ἐπέδειξεν αὐτοῖς τὰς χεῖρας καὶ τοὺς πόδας (and having said thus, [he] showed to them the hands and the feet) – Byz: Stephanus Textus Receptus 1550, Scrivener's Textus Receptus 1894, RP Byzantine Majority Text 2005, Greek Orthodox Church
omitted – D, a, b, d, e, ff^{2}, l, r^{1}, syr^{s}, syr^{cur}. Tischendorf 8th Edition.

Luke 24:42

οἱ δὲ ἐπέδωκαν αὐτῷ ἰχθύος ὀπτοῦ μέρος· (and they gave him a piece of a broiled fish) – Alexandrian text-type: Westcott and Hort 1881, Westcott and Hort / [NA27 and UBS4 variants] 1864–94, Tischendorf 8th Edition, Nestle 1904
Οἱ δὲ ἐπέδωκαν αὐτῷ ἰχθύος ὀπτοῦ μέρος, καὶ ἀπὸ μελισσίου κηρίου. (And they gave him a piece of a broiled fish, and of a honeycomb.) – Byz: Stephanus Textus Receptus 1550, Scrivener's Textus Receptus 1894, RP Byzantine Majority Text 2005, Greek Orthodox Church

Luke 24:46

οὕτως γέγραπται παθεῖν τὸν χριστὸν (thus it is written [that] the Christ/Messiah [would/will] suffer) – Alexandrian text-type: Westcott and Hort 1881, Westcott and Hort / [NA27 and UBS4 variants] 1864–94, Tischendorf 8th Edition, Nestle 1904
Οὕτως γέγραπται, καὶ οὕτως ἔδει παθεῖν τὸν χριστόν, (Thus it is written: And therefore it was necessary for the Christ/Messiah to suffer) – Byz: Stephanus Textus Receptus 1550, Scrivener's Textus Receptus 1894, RP Byzantine Majority Text 2005, Greek Orthodox Church

Luke 24:49

καθίσατε ἐν τῇ πόλει (stay in the city) – Alexandrian text-type: Westcott and Hort 1881, Westcott and Hort / [NA27 and UBS4 variants] 1864–94, Tischendorf 8th Edition, Nestle 1904
καθίσατε ἐν τῇ πόλει Ἱερουσαλήμ (stay in the city of Jerusalem) – Byz: Stephanus Textus Receptus 1550, Scrivener's Textus Receptus 1894, RP Byzantine Majority Text 2005, Greek Orthodox Church

Luke 24:50

ἕως πρὸς Βηθανίαν (as far as the vicinity of Bethany) – Alexandrian text-type
ἔξω ἕως εἰς Βηθανίαν (out as far as to Bethany) – Byz

Luke 24:51

καὶ ἀνεφέρετο εἰς τὸν οὐρανόν (and taken up into heaven), omitted by א*, D, a, b, d, e, ff^{2}, l
hiatus in r^{1}, syr^{s} (syr^{cur}) geo^{1}

Luke 24:52

προσκυνήσαντες αὐτὸν (upon worshiping Him) – omitted by D, a, b, d, e, ff^{2}, l (hiat r^{1}), syr^{s} (syr^{cur}), geo^{2}

Luke 24:53

εὐλογοῦντες τὸν θεόν. ("blessing God.") – Alexandrian text-type: Westcott and Hort 1881, Westcott and Hort / [NA27 and UBS4 variants] 1864–94, Nestle 1904
αἰνουντες τὸν θεόν. ("praising God.") – Western text-type. Tischendorf 8th Edition.
αἰνουντες καὶ εὐλογοῦντες τὸν θεόν. Ἀμήν. ("praising and blessing God. Amen.") – Byz: Stephanus Textus Receptus 1550, Scrivener's Textus Receptus 1894, RP Byzantine Majority Text 2005, Greek Orthodox Church

== See also ==
- Alexandrian text-type
- Biblical inerrancy
- Byzantine text-type
- Caesarean text-type
- Categories of New Testament manuscripts
- Comparison of codices Sinaiticus and Vaticanus
- List of New Testament verses not included in modern English translations
- Textual variants in the New Testament
  - Textual variants in the Gospel of Matthew
  - Textual variants in the Gospel of Mark
  - Textual variants in the Gospel of John
- Western text-type
