= Textual variants in the Gospel of John =

Differences in New Testament manuscripts

Textual variants in the Gospel of John are the subject of the study called textual criticism of the New Testament. Textual variants in manuscripts arise when a copyist makes deliberate or inadvertent alterations to a text that is being reproduced. An abbreviated list of textual variants in this particular book is given in this article below.

Origen, writing in the 3rd century, was one of the first who made remarks about differences between manuscripts of texts that were eventually collected as the New Testament. In John 1:28, he preferred "Bethabara" over "Bethany" as the location where John was baptizing (Commentary on John VI.40 (24)). "Gergeza" was preferred over "Geraza" or "Gadara" (Commentary on John VI.40 (24) – see Matthew 8:28).

Some common alterations include the deletion, rearrangement, repetition, or replacement of one or more words when the copyist's eye returns to a similar word in the wrong location of the original text. If their eye skips to an earlier word, they may create a repetition (error of dittography). If their eye skips to a later word, they may create an omission. They may resort to performing a rearranging of words to retain the overall meaning without compromising the context. In other instances, the copyist may add text from memory from a similar or parallel text in another location. Otherwise, they may also replace some text of the original with an alternative reading. Spellings occasionally change. Synonyms may be substituted. A pronoun may be changed into a proper noun (such as "he said" becoming "Jesus said"). John Mill's 1707 Greek New Testament was estimated to contain some 30,000 variants in its accompanying textual apparatus which was based on "nearly 100 [Greek] manuscripts." Peter J. Gurry puts the number of non-spelling variants among New Testament manuscripts around 500,000, though he acknowledges his estimate is higher than all previous ones.

== Legend ==
A guide to the sigla (symbols and abbreviations) most frequently used in the body of this article.

General sigla
# beginning with 0: uncial
# not beginning with 0: minuscule
^{*} superscript: original reading
^{c} superscript: scribal correction
^{ms} superscript: individual manuscript
^{mss} superscript: multiple manuscripts
^{pt} superscript: partial attestation
^{vid} superscript: uncertain reading
arab: Arabic versions
arm: Armenian versions
𝔐 or Byz: Byzantine text-type
cop: Coptic versions

sa: Sahidic version
bo: Boharic version

eth: Ethiopic versions
ƒ: Greek manuscripts family
geo: Georgian versions
goth: Gothic versions
it: Italic/Vetus Latina
lat: most Italic and Vulgate
latt: all Italic and Vulgate
𝔓: papyrus
𝑙: individually numbered lectionary
Lect: most or all numbered lectionaries
parenthesized (): approximate reading
rell: all other extant manuscripts
slav: Slavic versions
syr: Syriac versions
vg: Latin Vulgate
ς: Textus Receptus

Uncial sigla
א: Codex Sinaiticus (01)
A: Codex Alexandrinus (02)
B: Codex Vaticanus (03)
C: Codex Ephraemi Rescriptus (04)
D^{ea}: Codex Bezae (05)
D^{p}: Codex Claromontanus (06)
K^{e}: Codex Cyprius (017)
K^{ap}: Codex Mosquensis I (018)
L^{e}: Codex Regius (New Testament) (019)
L^{ap}: Codex Angelicus (020)
P^{apr}: Codex Porphyrianus (025)
S: Codex Vaticanus 354 (028)
V: Codex Mosquensis II (031)
W: Codex Washingtonianus (032)
Z: Codex Dublinensis (035)
Γ: Codex Tischendorfianus IV (036)
Δ: Codex Sangallensis 48 (037)
Θ: Codex Koridethi (038)
Ξ: Codex Zacynthius (040)
Π: Codex Petropolitanus (New Testament) (041)
Φ: Codex Beratinus (043)
Ψ: Codex Athous Lavrensis (044)
Ω: Codex Athous Dionysiou (045)
ff^{1}: Codex Corbeiensis I
ff^{2}: Codex Corbeiensis II
g^{1}: Codex Sangermanensis I
k: Codex Bobiensis

Critical editions
T8th: Tischendorf's 8th Edition of Editio Octava Critica Maior
WH: Westcott and Hort (1881)
NA: Novum Testamentum Graece (Nestle–Aland)
UBS: United Bible Societies
ECM: Editio Critica Maior

== Textual variants ==
Textual variants in the Gospel of John

5 Textual variants in John 1

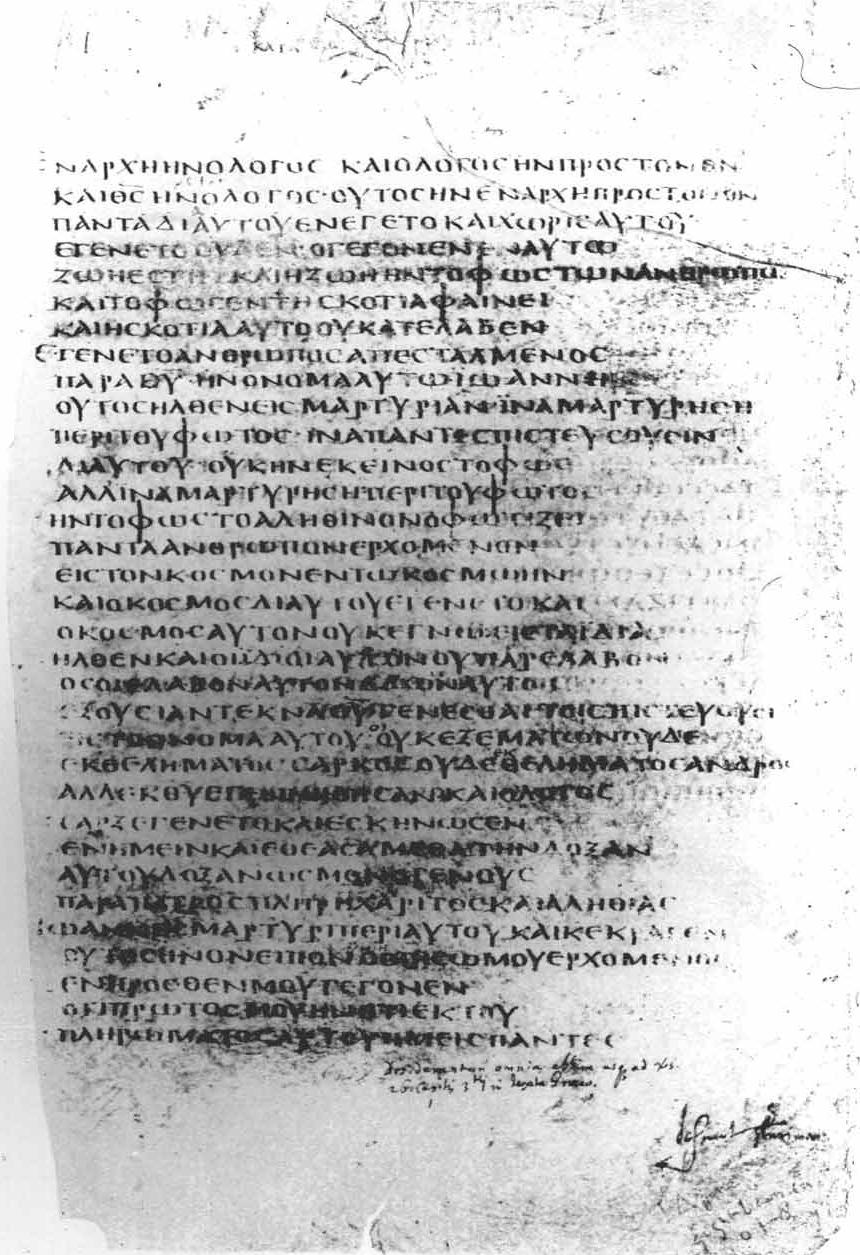
Codex Bezae, text of John 1:1-16

John 1:4

εν αυτῳ ζωη εστιν (in him is life) – א D it vg^{mss} Irenaeus^{lat} Heracleon Clement^{pt} Origen^{pt}
text omitted – W^{supp}
εν αυτῳ ζωη ῃν (in him was life) – All other mss. (rell)

John 1:18

ο μονογενης υιος (the only-begotten son) – A C^{3} K X Δ Θ Π 063 0234 f^{1,13} 28 565 700 892 1009 1010 1071 1079 1195 1216 1230 1241 1242 1253 1344 1365 1546 1646 2148 Byz, syr^{c} Georgian mss. of Adysh (9th century)
ο μονογενης θεος (the only-begotten God) – 𝔓^{75} א^{c} 33 cop^{bo}
μονογενης θεος (God [the] only-begotten) – 𝔓^{66} א* B C* L
ⲠⲚⲞⲨⲦⲈ ⲠϢⲎⲢⲈ ⲚⲞⲨⲰⲦ (only children God) – cop^{sa}

John 1:28

εν Βηθανιᾳ εγενετο – 𝔓^{59}^{vid}, 𝔓^{75}, A, B, C,*, L, W^{supp}, X, Δ, Θ, Ψ, 063, 28, 565, 700, 892*, 1009, 1010, 1071, 1195, 1216, 1241, 1242, 1253, 1344, 1365*, 2148, 2174, Byz, Lect, it, vg, syr
εγενετο εν Βηθανιᾳ – 𝔓^{66}, א*, it^{a, b, e, r^{1}}, cop^{sa}
εν Βηθαβαρᾳ εγενετο – C^{2}, K, Ψ, 083, 0113, f^{1}, f^{13}, 33, 1079, 1230, 1365^{c}, 1546, 1646^{c}, and Byz
εν Βηθαραβᾳ εγενετο – 892, syr^{h^{mg}}, Origen
εγενετο εν Βηθαραβᾳ – א^{2}

John 1:30

υπερ – 𝔓^{5}, 𝔓^{66}, 𝔓^{75}, א* B C* W^{supp}
περι – א^{2} A C^{3} L Θ, Ψ, 063, 0101 f^{1} f^{13} Byz

John 1:34

ο εκλεκτος (the Elect One) – 𝔓^{5} 𝔓^{106}^{vid} 187 218 228 1784 it^{b*, e, ff^{2}} syr^{s, c} Ambrose Augustine
ο εκλεκτος του υιος (the elect Son) – it^{a,ff^{2c}} syr^{pal^{mss}} cop^{sa}
ο υιος (the Son) – rell

1 Textual variants in John 2

John 2:3

οινον ουκ ειχον οτι συνετελεσθη ο οινος του γαμου, ειτα (they did not have wine because the wine of the wedding reception was finished, then) – א* it^{mss} syr^{h^{mg}}
υστερησαντος οινου (they were running short of wine) – rell

3 Textual variants in John 3

John 3:12

πιστευετε (ye believe) – 𝔓^{75} 050 083 579 it^{aur,ff^{2},l} vg^{mss} co^{bo^{mss}}
πιστευσετε (ye will believe) – rell

John 3:16

υιον – 𝔓^{66} 𝔓^{75} א* B W^{supp}
υιον αυτου – rell

John 3:20

τα εργα αυτου – א B Δ 050 063 083 086 28 700 1230 1242^{c} 1253 1365 2148 Byz ℓ^{mss} it cop^{fay} arm geo
αυτου τα εργα – 𝔓^{75}, A, K, W^{supp}, Π, f^{1}, 565, 892*, 1079, 1546,
τα εργα αυτου οτι πονηρα εστιν – 𝔓^{66} Θ f^{13} 33 1009 1010 1071 1195 1216 1242* 1344 1646 2174 it^{r^{1}} cop^{sa,bo,ach^{2}}
τα εργα αυτου πονηρα εστιν οτι – L
τα εργα αυτου οτι πονηρα εισιν – Ψ
αυτου τα εργα οτι πονηρα εισιν – 892^{mg} 1241

5 Textual variants in John 4

John 4:9

ου γαρ συγχρωνται Ιουδαιοι Σαμαριταις (for Jews have no association with Samaritans) omitted by א* D it^{a,b,d, e, j} cop^{fay}

John 4:37

Verse omitted in 𝔓^{75}

John 4:42

ο χριστος (the Christ) – A C^{3} D L X^{supp} Δ Θ Ψ 0141 f^{1,13} 33 565 579 1071 Byz it^{mss} syr^{p,h} cop^{bo^{mss}}
text omitted – 𝔓^{66} 𝔓^{75} א B C* W^{supp} 083^{vid} ℓ^{mss} it^{mss} vg syr^{c} cop^{sa,bo^{mss}} arm Irenaeus^{lat} Origen

John 4:46

ο Ιησους (Jesus) – A Θ Ψ f^{1,13} Byz it^{mss} syr^{p,h} cop^{bo^{mss}}
text omitted – 𝔓^{66} 𝔓^{75} א B C* W^{supp} 086 33 1241 it^{mss} vg syr^{c} cop^{sa,bo^{mss}}

John 4:53

text ο Ιησους omitted – א* N*
ο Ιησους (Jesus) – rell

2 Textual variants in John 5

John 5:2

βηθζαθα – א 33 b 1 ff^{2}
βηλζεθα – D a r^{1}
βηζαθα – L e
βηθεσδα – A C Byz f q TR
βησθεσδα – N
βηθσαιδα – 𝔓^{75} B W 0125 aur c vg bo
βηδσαιδα – 𝔓^{66} sa

John 5:4

Verse omitted by 𝔓^{66} 𝔓^{75} א B C* D T W^{supp} 0141 33 157 821 2718 it^{mss} vg^{mss} syr^{c} co arm geo

2 Textual variants in John 6

John 6:1

της θαλασσης της Γαλιλαιας της Τιβεριαδος – א A B K L W Δ Π Ψ 063 f^{1,13} 28 33 565
της θαλασσης της Γαλιλαιας – 𝔓^{66} 1546
της θαλασσης της Τιβεριαδος – 0210 1242 1344 2174 ℓ 184
της θαλασσης της Γαλιλαιας και της Τιβεριαδος – V it^{f} goth
της θαλασσης της Γαλιλαιας εις τα μερη της Τιβεριαδος – D Θ 892 1009 1230 1253

John 6:4

Verse omitted by 472

2 Textual variants in John 7

John 7:1

ου γαρ ειχεν εξουσιαν (for he did not have authority) – W 196 743 it^{a,b,ff^{2}l,r^{1}} syr^{c} Chrysostom
ου γαρ ηθελεν (for he was not wanting) – All other mss. (rell)

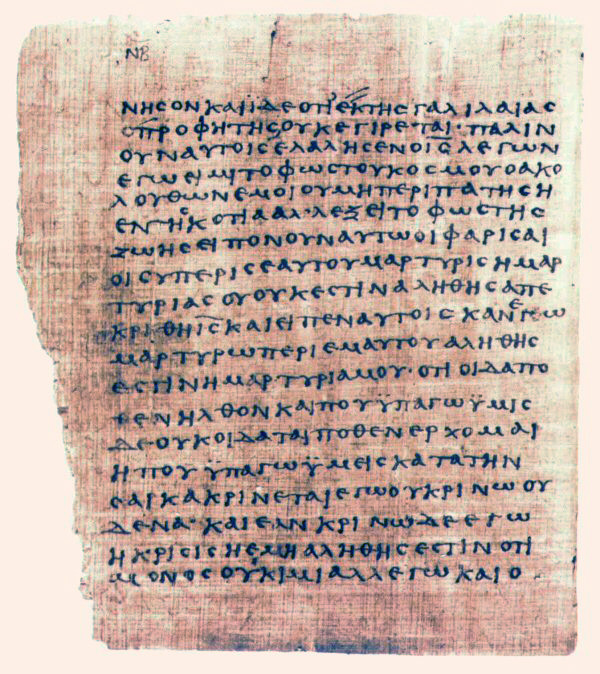
𝔓^{66} lacks John 7:53-8:11

John 7:53-8:11

Include D^{ea}, F^{e}, G^{e}, H^{e}, K^{e}, M, U, Γ, Π, 047, 0233, 28, 318, 700, 892, 1009, 1010, 1071, 1079, 1195, 1216, 1344, 1365, 1546, 1646, 2148, 2174, lat, syr^{pal}, Didascalia, Didymus the Blind, Jerome, Augustine, Apostolic Constitutions
Exclude א, B, 𝔓75, 𝔓66, W, T, N, Ψ, C, A, goth

1 Textual variants in John 8

John 8:8

ενος εκαστου αυτων τας αμαρτιας (the sins of every one of them) – U 73 331 364 658 700 782 1592 it arm
text transposed to John 8:6 – 264

1 Textual variants in John 9

John 9:35

εις τον υιον του ανθρωπου (in the Son of Man) – 𝔓^{66} 𝔓^{75} א Β D W 397 it^{d} syr^{s} co^{sa}
εις τον υιον του θεου (in the Son of God) – A K L X Δ Θ Ψ 070 0141 0250 f^{1,13} 28 33 565 700 Byz ℓ^{mss} it^{mss} vg syr^{p,h,pal} co^{bo} arm goth

1 Textual variants in John 10

John 10:7

η θυρα (door) – majority
ο ποιμην (shepherd) – 𝔓^{75} cop^{sa} cop^{ac}

0 Textual variants in John 11

John 11:1

1 Textual variants in John 12

John 12:28

δοξασον σου το ονομα (glorify thy name) – א A C K W Δ Θ Π Ψ 0250 28 565 700 892 1009 1010 1079 1195 1216 1230 1242 1344 1365 1546 1646 2148 Byz ℓ 69 ℓ 70 ℓ 211 ℓ 1579 ℓ 1761
δοξασον μου το ονομα (glorify my name) – B
δοξασον σου τον υιον (glorify thy son) – L X f^{1,13}33 1071 1241 vg sy^{h mg}, cop^{bo}
δοξασον σου το ονομα εν τη δοξη η ειχον παρα σοι προ του τον κοσμον γενεσται – D it^{d}

1 Textual variants in John 13

John 13:2

Ιουδας Σιμωνος Ισκαριωτου – L Ψ 0124 1241
Ιουδα Σιμωνος απο Καρυωτου – D it^{(d),e}

1 Textual variants in John 14

John 14:14

Verse omitted by X Λ* 0141 f^{1} 565 1009 1365 ℓ 76 ℓ 253 it^{b} vg^{ms} syr^{s,pal} arm geo Diatessaron^{mss}

0 Textual variants in John 15

John 15:1

1 Textual variants in John 16

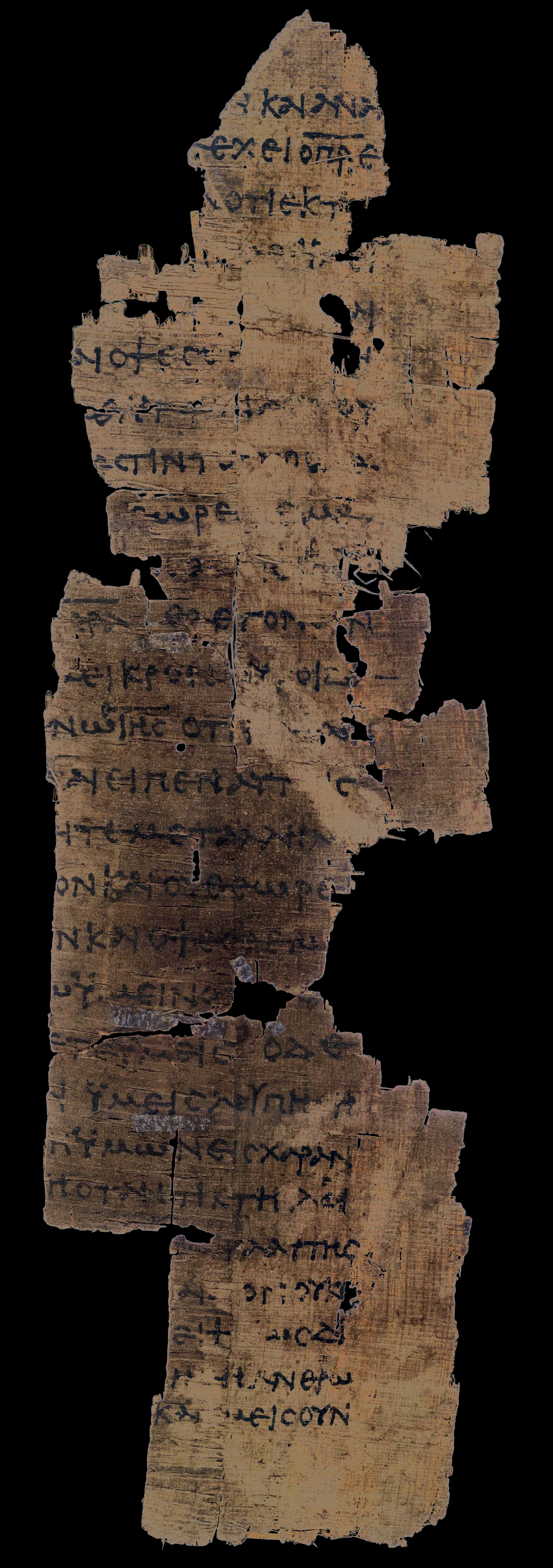
𝔓^{5} with fragment of John 16:22-30

John 16:28

εξηλθον παρα του πατρος (I came forth from the Father) omitted in D W it^{b,d,ff^{2}} syr^{s} cop^{mss}

1 Textual variants in John 17

John 17:14

καθως εγω ουκ ειμι εκ του κοσμου (just as I am not of the world) omitted in 𝔓^{66}* D f^{13} it syr^{s}

3 Textual variants in John 18

John 18:5

ο παραδιδους αυτον (the one betraying him), the phrase is omitted in 𝔓^{66}* syr^{s}

John 18:11

παντες γαρ οι λαβοντες μαχαιραν εν μαχαιρα απολουνται – Θ

John 18:21

ερωτας – א* A B C L W Θ Ψ 054 0250 33 1424 al
επερωτας – D^{s} f^{1} f^{13} Byz

2 Textual variants in John 19

John 19:29

υσσωπω – 𝔓^{66} א^{c} A D^{supp} K L X Π Ψ 054 f^{1} 28 33 565 700 1009 1010 1071 Byz
μετα χολης και υσσωπου – Θ 892^{supp} 1195 2174

John 19:39

μίγμα – 𝔓^{66} א^{c} A D^{supp} K L X Θ Π 054 f^{1} f^{13} 28 33 565 700 1009 1010 1071
ἕλιγμα – א* B W cop^{bo}
σμίγμα – Ψ 892^{supp} 2174 ℓ 47
σμῆγμα – 1242* ℓ 181 syr^{pal}
malagmani – it^{e}

2 Textual variants in John 20

John 20:21

ο Ιησους (Jesus) omitted in א D L W Ψ 050 lat syr^{s} co

John 20:31

ζωην αιωνιον (life eternal) – א C(*) D L Ψ 0100 f^{13} 33 it vg^{mss} syr^{p, h} cop^{sa,bo} Irenaeus^{lat}
ζωην (life) – rell

1 Textual variants in John 21

John 21:7

οι δε ειπον δι οληϲ (τηϲ) νυκτοϲ εκοπιαϲαμεν και (κοπιαϲαντεϲ) ουδεν ελαβομεν επι δε τω ϲω ρηματι (ονοματι) βαλουμεν (and they said: we toiled all night and took nothing, but at your word we will let down) – 𝔓^{66}, א^{1}, Ψ, some mss of Vulgate, cop^{bo}

== See also ==
- Alexandrian text-type
- Biblical inerrancy
- Byzantine text-type
- Caesarean text-type
- Categories of New Testament manuscripts
- Comparison of codices Sinaiticus and Vaticanus
- List of New Testament verses not included in modern English translations
- Textual variants in the New Testament
  - Textual variants in the Gospel of Matthew
  - Textual variants in the Gospel of Mark
  - Textual variants in the Gospel of Luke
- Western text-type
