= Lectionary 49 =

Lectionary ℓ 49
- New Testament manuscript
- Text: Evangelistarion
- Date: 10th-century
- Script: Greek
- Now at: State Historical Museum
- Size: 32.7 cm by 23.7 cm

Lectionary 49, designated by siglum ℓ 49 (in the Gregory-Aland numbering). It is a Greek manuscript of the New Testament, on parchment leaves. Palaeographically it has been assigned to the 10th- or 11th-century.

== Description ==
The codex contains Lessons from the Gospels of John, Matthew, Luke lectionary (Evangelistarium), on 437 parchment leaves (32.7 cm by 23.7 cm). It is written in two columns per page, in 23 lines per page, in Greek minuscule letters. It contains pictures.

Matthew 10:12

It reads λεγοντες ειρηνη τω οικω τουτω for αυτην – the reading is supported by manuscripts: Sinaiticus*^{,2}, Bezae, Regius, Washingtonianus, Koridethi, Φ f^{1} 22 99 237 251 1010, (1424), it vg^{cl}.

Mark 6:33

It has textual reading ἐκεῖ καὶ προῆλθον αὐτούς along with Codex Sinaiticus, Codex Vaticanus, 0187 (omit εκει), 892, ℓ 69, ℓ 70, ℓ 299, ℓ 303, ℓ 333, ℓ 1579, (ℓ 950 αυτους), it^{aur}, vg, (cop^{sa, bo}).

Luke 9:35

It uses the longest reading αγαπητος εν ο ευδοκησα — as in codices C^{3}, Codex Bezae, Codex Athous Lavrensis, ℓ 19, ℓ 31, ℓ 47, ℓ 48, ℓ 183, ℓ 183^{m}, ℓ 211^{m};

== History ==
The manuscript was presented in 1312 by Nicephorus, metropolite of Crete, to the monastery of the Birth of God Brontochiu. It was examined by Matthaei.

The manuscript is sporadically cited in the critical editions of the Greek New Testament (UBS3).

Currently the codex is located in the State Historical Museum, (V. 12, S. 225) in Moscow.

== See also ==
- List of New Testament lectionaries
- Biblical manuscript
- Textual criticism
