= Lectionary 211 =

Lectionary ℓ 211
- New Testament manuscript
- Text: Evangelistarium †
- Date: 12th century
- Script: Greek
- Now at: Bodleian Library
- Size: 31.2 cm by 20.5 cm
- Hand: ill written

Lectionary 211 is a Greek lectionary manuscript of the New Testament, written on parchment. It is designated by the siglum ℓ 211 in the Gregory-Aland numbering of New Testament manuscripts. Using the study of comparative writings styles (palaeography), it has been assigned to the 12th century. Biblical scholar Frederick H. A. Scrivener labelled it by 218^{evl}. The manuscript has complex contents.

== Description ==
The manuscript is a codex (precursor to the modern book) containing lessons (or readings, also known as lectons) from the Gospels of John, Matthew, Luke (Evangelistarium), on 209 parchment leaves (31.2 cm by 20.5 cm). The text is written in Greek minuscule letters, in two columns per page, 28-30 lines per page. It contains pictures. It is a palimpsest, the lower text contains a Menaion, for January, written in minuscule letters in the 11th century.

The first leaf contains the history of St. Varus and six martyrs. There are weekday Gospel lessons. It contains the text of Matthew 16:2b–3, Luke 22:43-44, and John 8:3-11 (dedicated to Pelagia).

Some notable readings

Luke 9:35

αγαπητος εν ο ευδοκησα (beloved, in whom I am well pleased) — ℓ 211 C^{c3} D Ψ ℓ 19 ℓ 31 ℓ 47 ℓ 48 ℓ 49 ℓ 49 ℓ 183 ℓ 183^{m}
omit - Majority of manuscripts (Note: For more details of the variants of this verse see: Textual variants in the Gospel of Luke.)

John 4:51

υιος σου (my son) — ℓ 211 𝔓^{66}^{c} D K L Π 33 892 1071 1079 1216 1230 1241 + others
παις σου (my child) - Γ Δ Θ Ψ ƒ^{1} 565 700 1424 Majority of manuscripts sy^{h} ; Origen

John 6:42

την μητερα και τον πατερα (His mother and His father) - ℓ 211
τον πατερα και την μητερα (His father and His mother) - Majority of manuscripts

== History ==
The earliest history of the manuscript is unknown. Scrivener dated the manuscript to the 14th century, though biblical scholar Caspar René Gregory dated it to the 12th or 13th century. It is presently assigned by the INTF to the 12th century. The manuscript is cited in numerous releases of the critical editions of the Greek New Testament (UBS3, UBS4.).

The manuscript was added to the list of New Testament manuscripts by Scrivener (number 218), and Gregory (number 211). C. R. Gregory saw it in 1883. The manuscript is currently located in the Bodleian Library (shelf number Wake 18) at Oxford, England.

== See also ==
- List of New Testament lectionaries
- Biblical manuscript
- Textual criticism
