= Lectionary 31 =

Greek manuscript of the New Testament

Lectionary ℓ 31
- New Testament manuscript
- Name: Cod. Norimberg.
- Text: Evangelistarion
- Date: 12th-century
- Script: Greek
- Now at: Nürnberg
- Size: 22 cm by 18.9 cm
- Type: Caesarean text-type

Lectionary 31, designated by siglum ℓ 31 (in the Gregory-Aland numbering). It is a Greek manuscript of the New Testament, on parchment leaves. Palaeographically it has been assigned to the 12th-century.

== Description ==
The codex contains lessons from the Gospels of John, Matthew, Luke lectionary (Evangelistarium). The text is written in Greek minuscule letters, on 281 parchment leaves (22 cm by 18.9 cm), 1 column per page, 21 lines per page.

Michaelis remarked some textual similarities to the codices Codex Bezae (e.g. Luke 22:4), Codex Regius, 1 and 69.

Luke 9:35

It uses the longest reading αγαπητος εν ο ευδοκησα — as in codices C^{3}, Codex Bezae, Codex Athous Lavrensis, ℓ 19, ℓ 47, ℓ 48, ℓ 49, ℓ 49^{m}, ℓ 183, ℓ 183^{m}, ℓ 211;

The manuscript is sporadically cited in the critical editions of the Greek New Testament (UBS3).

Currently the codex is located in the Stadtbibliothek (Ms. Cent. V appendix No. 40) in Nürnberg.

== See also ==
- List of New Testament lectionaries
- Biblical manuscript
- Textual criticism

== Bibliography ==
- Christoph Gottlieb von Murr, Beschreibung der vornehmsten Merkwurdigkeiten des H. R. Reichs freyen Stadt Nürnberg, Nürnberg 1778.
