= Codex Athous Lavrensis =

Uncial 044
- New Testament manuscript
- Name: Athous Laurae
- Sign: Ψ
- Text: Gospels, Acts, Pauline epistles, General Epistles
- Date: 8th/9th century
- Script: Greek
- Found: 1886 Gregory
- Now at: Athos
- Size: 21 x 15.3 cm
- Type: mixed; Alexandrian / Byzantine
- Category: III/II
- Note: marginalia

The Codex Athous Laurae is a manuscript of the New Testament written in Greek uncial letters on parchment. It is designated by Ψ or 044 in the Gregory-Aland numbering of New Testament manuscripts, and δ 6 in the von Soden numbering of New Testament Manuscripts. The manuscript has many gaps in the text, as well as containing handwritten notes (known as marginalia). Using the study of comparative writing styles (palaeography), it has been dated to the 8th or 9th century. It is currently kept in the Great Lavra monastery (shelf number B' 52) on the Athos peninsula.

== Description ==
The manuscript is a codex (precursor to the modern book format), containing 261 parchment leaves (sized 21 by 15.3 centimetres (8.3 by 6.0 in)), with the text-block being 15 by 8.7 centimetres (5.9 by 3.4 in). The text is written in small uncial letters, in one column of 31 lines per page. The letters have breathings (utilised to designate vowel emphasis) and accents (used to indicate voiced pitch changes). The codex contains a table of contents (known as κεφαλαια / kephalaia) before each book, the Ammonian Sections and Eusebian Canons (early systems of dividing the four Gospels into different sections), lectionary notes in the margin (for liturgical use), musical notes (neumes), and subscriptions. It is considered one of the oldest manuscripts with musical notes.

Textual overview

The codex originally contained the entire New Testament except for the Book of Revelation, with several gaps at both the beginning and end. The Gospel of Matthew, the Gospel of Mark 1:1-9:4, and one leaf from Hebrews with text 8:11-9:19 have subsequently been lost.

The order of the books in the codex are as follows:

- Gospels
- Acts of the Apostles
- General epistles
- Pauline epistles

The General epistles are in an unusual order (1-2 Peter, James, 1-3 John, and Jude; James usually comes before 1 Peter). There is also a shorter ending to the Gospel of Mark before the longer version. This is similar to the ending found in other Greek New Testament manuscripts, such as Codex Regius (L) and all other Greek codices in which the general epistles appear.

== Text ==
The Greek text of this codex is considered a representative of the Byzantine text-type, but with a large portion of Alexandrian readings, as well as some Western readings. The text-types are groups of different manuscripts which share specific or generally related readings, which then differ from each other group, and thus the conflicting readings can separate out the groups, which are then used to determine the original text as published; there are three main groups with names: Alexandrian, Western, and Byzantine.

Despite being an unusually mixed text, von Soden lists it as generally Alexandrian due to the Gospel of Mark and the General Epistles being mostly in-line with the Alexandrian text-type. In the Gospel of Luke and John, the Byzantine element is predominate, but with a larger proportion of Alexandrian readings than in Codex Sangallensis 48. The text of the General Epistles appeared to be the same type as found in Codex Alexandrinus, Minuscule 33, Minuscule 81, and Minuscule 436. Biblical scholar Kurt Aland placed the text of the codex in Category III in the Gospels, Acts, Pauline Epistles, and its text of the General Epistles in Category II of his New Testament manuscript text classification system. Category III manuscripts are described as having "a small but not a negligible proportion of early readings, with a considerable encroachment of [Byzantine] readings, and significant readings from other sources as yet unidentified", and Category II manuscripts as those "of a special quality, i.e., manuscripts with a considerable proportion of the early text, but which are marked by alien influences. These influences are usually of smoother, improved readings, and in later periods by infiltration by the Byzantine text."

Mark 11:26 and Mark 15:28, along with John 7:53–8:11 (the Pericope Adulterae), are omitted.

Some textual variants

Mark 9:49

καὶ πᾶσα θυσία ἀναλωθήσεται (and every sacrifice shall be consumed) - Ψ
καὶ πᾶσα θυσία ἁλὶ ἁλισθήσεται (and every sacrifice salted with salt) - Majority of manuscripts
omit. - B L Δ 0274 ƒ^{1} ƒ^{13} 28* 700 sy^{s} sa bo^{pt}.

Mark 10:7

καὶ προσκολληθήσεται πρὸς τὴν γυναῖκα αὐτοῦ (and be joined to his wife)

omit. – Ψ א B 892 ℓ 48 sy^{s} goth
incl. - Majority of manuscripts

Mark 10:19

μὴ ἀποστερήσῃς (do not defraud)

omit. - Ψ B^{*} K W Δ ƒ^{1} ƒ^{13} 28 579 700 1010 1079 1242 1546 2148 ℓ 10 ℓ 950 ℓ 1642 ℓ 1761 sy^{s} arm geo
incl. - B^{c2} Majority of manuscripts

Luke 9:35

ὁ ἀγαπητός ἐν ᾧ εὐδόκησα (the beloved, in Whom I am well pleased) – Ψ C^{3} D ℓ 19 ℓ 31 ℓ 47 ℓ 48 ℓ 49 ℓ 49^{m} ℓ 183 ℓ 183^{m} ℓ 211^{m}
ὁ ἐκλελεγμένος (the chosen) – 𝔓^{45} 𝔓^{75} א B L Ξ 892 1241
ὁ ἀγαπητός (the beloved) – Majority of manuscripts (Note: For more details of the variants of this verse see: Textual variants in the Gospel of Luke.)

John 20:31

ζωὴν αἰώνιον (eternal life) – Ψ א C^{(*)} D L 0100 ƒ^{13} it vg^{mss} sy^{p}^{, h**} sa bo
ζωὴν (life) - Majority of manuscripts

Acts 15:23

γράψαντης ἐπιστολήν διὰ χειρὸς αὐτῶν ἔχουσαν τὸν τύπον τοῦτον (with a written letter by their hand, having the following contents:) - Ψ
γράψαντες διὰ χειρὸς αὐτῶν (being written by their hand) – 𝔓^{45} 𝔓^{74} א* A B bo
γράψαντες διὰ χειρὸς αὐτῶν τάδε (having written this by their hand) – א^{c} E (33) Majority of manuscripts sy^{h}
γράψαντης διὰ χειρὸς αὐτῶν ἐπιστολήν περιέχουσαν τάδε (having written by their hand a letter, containing this:) – C ar c gig w geo
γράψαντης ἐπιστολήν διὰ χειρὸς αὐτῶν περιέχουσαν τάδε (having written a letter by their hand, containing this:) – D d
γράψαντες διὰ χειρὸς αὐτῶν ἐπιστολήν καὶ πέμψαντες περιέχουσαν τάδε (having written a letter by their hand, and sent it containing this:) – 614

Acts 20:15

μείναντες εἰς τὸ Γυλλίον· τῇ ἐχομένῃ (remaining within Gullion. On the next day) - Ψ
καὶ μείναντες ἐν Τρωγυλλίῳ, τῇ ἐχομένῃ (and remained in Trogyllium, on the next day) - Majority of manuscripts
τῇ δὲ ἐχομένῃ (and on the next day) - 𝔓^{41} 𝔓^{74} א A B C E 33 453 1175 1739 1891 2818 vg bo

Acts 20:28

τοῦ κυρίου (of the Lord) – Ψ 𝔓^{74} A C* D E 33 36 453 945 1739 1891
τοῦ θεοῦ (of God) - א B 614 1175 1505 vg sy bo^{ms}; Cyr
τοῦ κυρίου καὶ θεοῦ (of the Lord and God) - C^{3} Majority of manuscripts

Acts 27:16

Γαυδην (Gauda) – Ψ
Καῦδα (Kauda) – 𝔓74 א^{c} B 1175 lat sy^{p}
Κλαῦδα (Klauda) – א* A^{(vid)} 33 81 614 945 1505 1739 vg^{mss} sy^{h}
Κλαύδην (Klaudan) – L 323. 1241 Majority of manuscripts

Acts 28:29

καὶ ταῦτα αὐτοῦ εἰπόντος, ἀπῆλθον οἱ Ἰουδαῖοι, πολλὴν ἔχοντες ἐν ἑαυτοῖς συζήτησιν (And when he had said these words, the Jews departed and had a great dispute among themselves)

omit. – Ψ 𝔓^{74} א A B E 048 33 81 1175 1739 2464
incl. - Majority of manuscripts

Romans 8:1

Ἰησοῦ, μὴ κατὰ σάρκα περιπατοῦσιν (of Jesus, not living according to [the] flesh) – Ψ A D^{b} Minuscule 81 629 2127 vg
Ἰησοῦ (of Jesus) – א^{*} B D G 1739 1881 it^{d, g} sa bo eth
Ἰησοῦ, μὴ κατὰ σάρκα περιπατοῦσιν, ἀλλὰ κατὰ πνεῦμα (of Jesus, not living according to [the] flesh, but according to [the] Spirit) – א^{c} D^{c} K P 33 88 104 181 326 330 (436 omit μη) 456 614 630 1241 1877 1962 1984 1985 2492 2495 Majority of manuscripts Lect

Romans 16:25–27

insert after Romans 14:23 – Ψ L 0209 181 326 330 451 460 614 1241 1877 1881 1984 1985 2492 2495
insert after Romans 15:33 – 𝔓^{46}

1 Corinthians 2:1

μαρτύριον (witness) – Ψ B D G P 33 81 104 181 326 330 451 614 629 630 1241 1739 1877 1881 1962 1984 2127 2492 2495 Majority of manuscripts Lect it vg sy^{h} sa arm eth
μυστήριον (mystery) - 𝔓^{46}^{(vid)} א* A C ar r sy^{p} bo; Hipp BasA Ambst
σωτήριον (salvation) - 489 ℓ 598^{pt} ℓ 599

1 Corinthians 7:5

τῇ προσευχῇ (prayer) – Ψ 𝔓^{11} 𝔓^{46} א* A B C D G P 6 33 81 104 181 629 630 1739 1877 1881 1962 it vg cop arm eth.
τῇ νηστείᾳ καὶ τῇ προσευχῇ (fasting and prayer) – א^{2} K L 365 1241 1505 Majority of manuscripts sy
τῇ προσευχῇ καὶ νηστείᾳ (prayer and fasting) – 230 451 JoDam

1 Corinthians 12:9

χαρίσματα ἰαμάτων ἐν τῷ ἑνὶ πνεύματι (gifts of healing by the one Spirit) – Ψ A B 33 81 104 436 630 (1739 omits τῷ) 1881 it vg
χαρίσματα ἰαμάτων ἐν τῷ αὐτῷ πνεύματι (gifts of healing by his Spirit) – א C^{3} D G K P 0201 88 181 330 451 614 629 1241 1877 1962 1984 1985 2127 2492 2495 Majority of manuscripts Lect
χαρίσματα ἰαμάτων ἐν τῷ πνεύματι (gifts of healing by the Spirit) – 𝔓^{46}
χαρίσματα ἰαμάτων (gifts of healing) – C

Philippians 1:14

τοῦ θεοῦ (of God) – Ψ א A B (D*) P 33 81 104 326 365 629 1175 1241 2464
κυρίου (of [the] Lord) – F G; Cyp
omit. - 𝔓^{46} D^{2} Majority of manuscripts r Marcion^{T}

1 Timothy 3:16

θεὸς ἐφανερώθη (God was manifest) – Ψ א^{c3} A^{c} C^{c2} D^{c2} K L P 81 104 630. 1241. 1505. 1739. 1881 Majority of manuscripts vg^{ms}
ὃς ἐφανερώθη (Who was manifest) – א* A* C* F G 33 365 1175; Did Epiph (Note: For more textual variants of this verse see: Textual variants in the First Epistle to Timothy.)

1 Peter 4:14

κατὰ μὲν αὐτοὺς βλασφημεῖται, κατὰ δὲ ὑμᾶς δοξάζεται (indeed by them He is insulted, but by you He is glorified) – Ψ K L P 1448 1611 Majority of manuscripts it vg^{ww} sy^{h**} sa^{mss} bo^{ms} Cyp
omit. - 𝔓^{72} א A^{(vid)} B 049 33 81 323 614 630 945 1241 1739 vg sy^{p} bo

== History ==
The earliest history of the manuscript is unknown. It was seen by biblical scholar Caspar René Gregory on August 26th, 1886. He described it as the first of its kind. In 1892, the biblical scholar J. Rendel Harris did not examine the codex even though he was on a visit to Mount Athos, as he was only inspecting the Septuagint (an early Greek translation of the Old Testament) manuscripts there.

Von Goltz and Protestant theologian Georg Wobbermin had collated the text of Acts, the general epistles, and Pauline epistles for biblical scholar Hermann von Soden. It was examined by biblical scholar Kirsopp Lake in 1899, who thoroughly examined the Gospel of Mark and collated the text of the gospels of Luke and John. He did not examine the text of Acts and the epistles because, according to Soden, their text was ordinary. In 1903, Lake published the text of the Gospel of Mark 9:5-16:20, and a collation of the gospels of Luke, John, and the Epistle to the Colossians in Studia Biblica et Ecclesiastica.

It is currently dated by the INTF to the 9th or 10th century. It is presently housed in the Great Lavra monastery (shelf number B' 52) on Mount Athos.

== See also ==
- Codex Athous Dionysiou (Ω / 045)
- Codex Beratinus (Φ / 043)
- List of New Testament uncials
- Textual criticism
- Biblical manuscript
