= Lectionary 181 =

Lectionary ℓ 181
- New Testament manuscript
- Name: Parham Evangelistarium Unciale
- Text: Evangelistarion †
- Date: 980
- Script: Greek
- Found: 1837
- Now at: British Library
- Size: 31.3 by 22 cm
- Hand: beautifully written

Lectionary 181, designated by siglum ℓ 181 (in the Gregory-Aland numbering) is a Greek manuscript of the New Testament, on parchment leaves. Dated by a colophon to the year 980. Formerly it was labelled as Lectionary 234^{e} (Scrivener). Gregory gave the number 181^{e} to it.

== Description ==
The codex contains Lessons from the Gospels of John, Matthew, Luke lectionary (Evangelistarium), on 222 parchment leaves (31.3 cm by 22 cm), with some lacunae. It is written in Greek uncial letters, in two columns per page, 22 lines per page. It is beautifully written.

== History ==
The manuscript was written by Nicholas for bishop Stephanus from Ciscissa, in Cappadocia Prima. It was brought by Lord de la Zouche, from Caracalla at Mount Athos in 1837. A note dated 1049 is subjoined by a reviser, who perhaps made the numerous changes in the text, and added two Lessons in cursive letters.

The manuscript was collated by Scrivener, and slightly examined by Gregory in 1883.

The manuscript is sporadically cited in the critical editions of the Greek New Testament (UBS3).

Currently the codex is located in the British Library, (Add. 39602) at London.

== See also ==
- List of New Testament lectionaries
- Biblical manuscript
- Textual criticism

== Bibliography ==
- F. H. A. Scrivener, An Exact Transcript of the Codex Augiensis (Cambridge and London, 1859), pp. L-LII. (as P)
- Kirsopp Lake and Silva Lake, Dated Minuscule Manuscripts to the Year 1200, vol. IX, (Boston, 1939), 362.
