= Minuscule 892 =

- New Testament manuscript
- Text: Gospels †
- Date: 9th century
- Script: Greek
- Found: 1887
- Now at: British Library
- Cite: J. R. Harris, "An Important MS of the New Testament", JBL, IX (1890), pp. 31-59
- Size: 23.5 cm by 11.5 cm
- Type: Alexandrian text-type
- Category: II

Minuscule 892 is a Greek minuscule manuscript of the New Testament Gospels, written on parchment. It is designated by the siglum 892 in the Gregory-Aland numbering of New Testament manuscripts, and ε 1016 in the von Soden numbering of New Testament manuscripts. Using the study of comparative writing styles (palaeography), it has been dated to the 9th century.

== Description ==
The manuscript is a codex (precursor to the modern book format), containing an almost complete text of the four Gospels written on 353 parchment leaves (23.5 cm by 11.5 cm), with some missing portions. The text of John 10:6-12:18 and 14:23-end were inserted by later hand on paper, likely from about the 16th century. The text is written in one column per page, with 20 lines per page, in minuscule letters. Square breathing marks are used throughout. It contains the tables of contents (known as κεφαλαια / kephalaia) at the beginning of each Gospel, along with beginning (αρχη / arche) and ending (τελος / telos) markings for the end of liturgical sections. Subscriptions are included at the end of each Gospel.

It includes the text of the Pericope Adulterae (John 7:53-8:11 - though with variants from the majority of manuscripts), Matthew 16:2b–3, Luke 22:43–44 (though this is surrounded by marks in the margin which could imply doubts as to authenticity), 23:34, and Mark 16:9-20. The Eusebian numbers in Mark however do not go past Mark 16:8. All these text sections are not contained in an array of varying Greek, and other language, manuscripts. In this manuscript, interpolation of the Alexandrian text-type can be seen in Matthew 27:49.

Words are written continuously without separation. Biblical scholar Hermann von Soden observed the manuscript preserved the division in pages and lines of its uncial parent. The copyist appears to leave lower parts of pages blank so as to begin the next section, therefore harmonising with the uncial parent. The Ammonian sections and the Eusebian Canons (both early divisions of the Gospel text into sections for easy navigation) are given in the left-hand margin.

The Synaxarion (list of saint's days) and Menologion (list of weekly church readings) were added in the 13th century. John 10:6-12:18; 14:24-21:25 was added by a later hand in the 16th century. The manuscript has been corrected many times, either by erasure or marginal notations, which appear to have been done by the initial copyist and another corrector. Biblical scholar James Rendel Harris remarked that he did not "ever remember to have examined or collated so impant a m[anu]s[cript] as this."

== Text ==
The Greek text of the codex is considered a representative of the late Alexandrian text-type, with some Byzantine readings. It is "one of the most important of all the minuscule manuscripts." It contains many remarkable readings of an early type. According to the Claremont Profile Method (a specific analysis of textual data), it represents the Alexandrian text-type in Luke 1, 10 and 20 as a core member. Biblical scholar Kurt Aland placed it in Category II of his New Testament manuscript classification system. Category II manuscripts are described as being manuscripts "of a special quality, i.e., manuscripts with a considerable proportion of the early text, but which are marked by alien influences. These influences are usually of smoother, improved readings, and in later periods by infiltration by the Byzantine text."

Some notable variants

Matthew 19:16

διδασκαλε (teacher) — 892^{txt} א B D L ƒ^{1} 1010 1365 ℓ 5 it^{a, d, e, ff1}, cop^{bo}, eth, geo, Origen, Hilary;
διδασκαλε αγαθε (good teacher) — 892^{mg} C K W Δ Θ ƒ^{13} 28 33 565 700 al Byz Lect it vg sy cop^{sa} arm eth Diatessaron.

Mark 6:33

ἐκεῖ καὶ προῆλθον αὐτούς (there, and came towards them) - 892 א B 0187 ℓ 49 ℓ 69 ℓ 70 ℓ 299 ℓ 303 ℓ 333 ℓ 1579 it^{aur} vg (cop^{sa, bo}).

Mark 10:7

και προσκολληθησεται προς την γυναικα αυτου (and be joined to his wife)

omit - 892 א B Ω ℓ 48 sy^{s} goth.

Luke 4:17

καὶ ἀνοίξας τὸ βιβλίον (and opened the book) - 892 A B L W Ξ 33 1195 1241 ℓ 547 sy^{s, h, pal} cop^{sa, bo}
καὶ ἀναπτύξας τὸ βιβλίον (and unrolled the book) - א D^{c} K Δ Θ Π Ψ ƒ^{1} ƒ^{13} 28 565 700 1009 1010 al.

John 1:28

Βηθαραβα (Betharaba) - 892 א^{c2} sy^{h} al.

John 6:1

της θαλασσης της Γαλιλαιας εις τα μερη της Τιβεριαδος (the sea of Galilee, into the midst of Tiberius) - 892 D Θ 1009 1230 1253.

== History ==
The codex was acquired by the British Museum in 1887 from H. L. Dupuis. It was studied by Dean Burgon who noted it shared readings with Codex Sinaiticus, later by J. R. Harris.

It is currently located in the British Library (Add. 33277) in London. It is dated to the 9th century CE.

== See also ==
- List of New Testament minuscules
- Textual criticism
- Biblical manuscript
