= Codex Zacynthius =

Greek New Testament codex, dated to the 6th century

Uncial 040
- New Testament manuscript
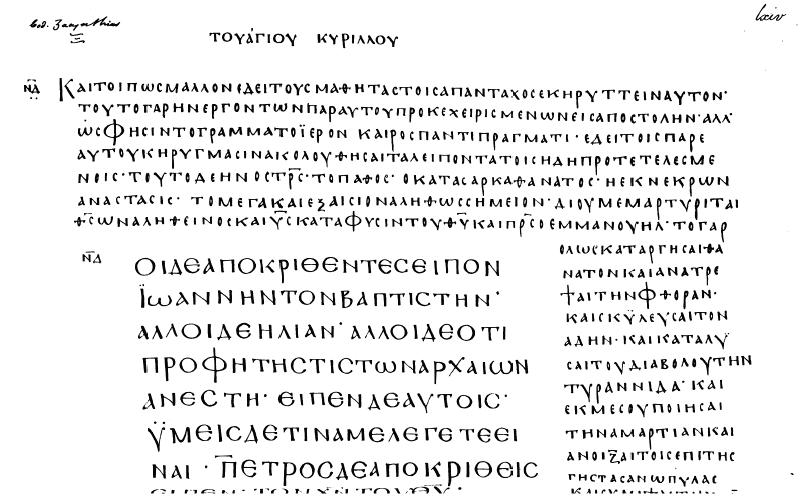
- Facsimile from Tregelles edition
- Name: Zacynthius
- Sign: Ξ
- Text: Gospel of Luke †
- Date: c. 550
- Script: Greek
- Found: Colin Macaulay, 1820
- Now at: Cambridge University Library
- Cite: Tregelles, Codex Zacynthius. Greek Palimpsest Fragments of the Gospel of Saint Luke, (1861)
- Size: 36 cm by 29 cm
- Type: Alexandrian
- Category: III
- Note: textually close to codex B

Codex Zacynthius is a 6th century Greek palimpsest manuscript of the New Testament. It is designated by the siglum Ξ or 040 in the Gregory-Aland numbering of New Testament manuscripts, and as A^{1} in the von Soden numbering of New Testament manuscripts. As a palimpsest, the original (lower) text was washed off its vellum pages and overwritten in the 12th or 13th century. The upper text of the palimpsest contains weekday Gospel lessons (known as a lectionary, ℓ299); the lower text contains portions of the Gospel of Luke, deciphered by biblical scholar and palaeographer Samuel P. Tregelles in 1861. First thought to have been written in the 8th century, using the study of comparative writing styles (palaeography), the lower text has been dated to the 6th century. The lower text is of most interest to scholars.

The manuscript came from Zakynthos, a Greek island, and has survived in a fragmentary condition. It was brought to England in 1821 and transferred to Cambridge University in 1985 which later purchased it after an appeal in 2014. It is often cited in critical editions of the Greek New Testament.

== Description ==
The manuscript is a codex (precursor to the modern book format), made of 86 thick, coarse parchment leaves and three partial leaves (sized 36 x 29 cm). The lower text of the manuscript contains fragments of the Gospel of Luke, chapters 1:1-11:33. The text was written in a single column with well-formed uncial script. The letters are large, round and narrow, without spiritus asper, spiritus lenis, or accents. The manuscript was written by two scribes.

Abbreviations are rarely used in the codex. The handwriting style is very close graphically to that of the Rossano Gospels. Some itacism errors occur. It uses grammatical forms typical of the ancient manuscripts (e.g. ειπαν, ηλθαν, ευραν), which are not used in later medieval manuscripts.

The codex uses a peculiar system of chapter divisions, which it shares with Codex Vaticanus (B) and Minuscule 579. A more common system divides the chapters according to their titles. The capital letters at the section beginnings stand out in the margin as in the Codices Alexandrinus and Ephraemi.

The text is surrounded by a marginal commentary; it is the only codex that has both text and commentary in uncial script. The commentary is a catena of quotations of nine church fathers: Origen, Eusebius, Titus of Bostra, Basil, Isidore of Pelusium, Cyril of Alexandria, Sever from Antioch, Victor from Antioch, and Chrysostom. The commentary surrounds the single-column text of Luke on three sides. Patristic text is written in small uncial letters. Most of the quotations are those of Ciril of Alexandria (93 scholia); next comes Titus of Bostra (45 scholia). The commentary was written in a different kind of uncial script than the biblical text.

=== Contents ===
The book contains the following chapters and verses of the Gospel of Luke: 1:1-9,19-23,27-28,30-32,36-60,77; 2:19,21-22,33-39; 3:5-8,11-20; 4:1-2,6-20,32-43; 5:17-36; 6:21-7:6,11-37,39-47; 8:4-21,25-35,43-50; 9:1-28,32-33,35.41-10:18,21-40; 11:1-4,24-33.

== Text ==
The lower text of the codex is considered to be a representative of the late Alexandrian text-type, and is similar to Codex Regius. Biblical scholars Kurt and Barbara Aland gave the following textual profile of it: 2^{1}, 8^{2}, 2^{1/2}, 3^{s}. This means the text of the codex agrees with the Byzantine standard text 2 times, 8 times with the original text against the Byzantine, and with both the Byzantine and original text 2 times. There are 3 independent or distinctive readings.

On the basis of this profile, the manuscript is placed in Category III of Kurt Aland's manuscript classification system. Category III manuscripts are described as having "a small but not a negligible proportion of early readings, with a considerable encroachment of [Byzantine] readings, and significant readings from other sources as yet unidentified." According to the Claremont Profile Method (a specific anaylsis of textual data), it represents the Alexandrian text in Luke 10 and mixed Byzantine text-type in Luke 1, which probably indicates sporadic Byzantine corrections.

Some notable readings

Luke 9:55b–56a

καὶ εἶπεν, Οὑκ οἴδατε οἵου πνεύματος ἑστε ὐμεῖς; ὀ γὰρ υἰὸς τοῦ ἁνθρώπου οὑκ ἦλθεν ψυχὰς ἁνθρώπων ἁπολέσαι ἁλλὰ σῶσαι (and He said: "You do not know what manner of spirit you are of; for the Son of man came not to destroy men's lives but to save them)

omit - Ξ א B C L Θ 33 700 892 1241 sy bo
incl. - Majority of manuscripts

Luke 4:17

καὶ ἀνοίξας τὸ βιβλίον (and opened the book) - Ξ A B L W 33 892 1195 1241 ℓ 547 sy^{s, h, pal} sa bo
καὶ ἀναπτύξας τὸ βιβλίον (and unrolled the book) - א D^{c} K Δ Θ Π Ψ ƒ^{1} ƒ^{13} 28 565 700 1009 1010

Luke 9:10

εις πολιν καλουμενην Βηθσαιδα (to a city called Bethsaida) - Ξ 𝔓^{75} B L 33 2542 sa bo
εις τοπον ερημον πολεως καλουμενην Βηδσαιδα (into a deserted place belonging to the city called Bethsaida) - Ξ^{mg} Majority of manuscripts

== Palimpsest ==
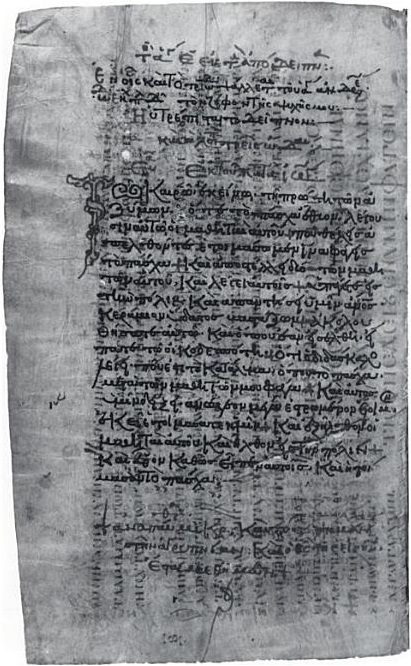
The underwriting is 7th-century majuscule of Luke 3:7-8 with commentary; the upper writing is 13th-century minuscule of Matthew 26:39-51, part lection for Holy Thursday

The codex is a palimpsest, meaning that the original text was scraped off and overwritten and the parchment leaves folded in half. The upper text was written by a minuscule hand and contains lectionary 299 (ℓ 299) from the 12th or 13th century, though the lectionary text is not complete; it is written on 176 leaves (28.7 cm by 18.2 cm), in one column per page, 33-36 lines per page. Three folios are only the lower halves of leaves, one folio was supplied with paper (folio LXVIII). The manuscript contains weekday Gospel lessons (Evangelistarium), but is lacunose. Tregelles did not collate its text because of its secondary value.Scrivener designated it by siglum 200, Gregory by 299.

The text of the lectionary is cited in some critical editions of the Greek New Testament (UBS3) in the following places: Matthew 10:4; 11:17; 12:47; 13:13; 14:22; 18:10; 22:30; 26:27; 28:9; Mark 1:27; 2:10.26; 4:16.20; 6:2.2.3.33. It is not cited in UBS4.

== History ==
=== Dating ===
Tregelles dated the manuscript to the 8th century. Tregelles was aware that the handwriting is typical for the 6th century, but the handwriting of the commentary is much older. The letters Ε Θ Ο Σ are round, high, and narrow, and could not have been written before the 8th century. C. R. Gregory supported Tregelles's point of view. According to Nicholas Pocock, the manuscript could not have been written before the 6th century nor after the 8th century.

William Hatch in 1937, on the basis of palaeographical data, suggested that the codex should be dated to the 6th century. It does not use breathings and accents and the text of the commentary is written in uncial script. Aland supported Hatch's point of view. (Note: UBS3 from 1983 dated the manuscript to the 8th century (UBS3, p. XVI.), but in the second edition of Der Text des Neues Testaments (1989) Aland dated it to the 6th century. NA26 from 1991 dated it to the 6th century (NA26, p. 693.).) This date is accepted by the majority of scholars.

David C. Parker in 2004 argued that manuscript was written later than the 6th century, because it has a small number of square letters, and the handwriting is not typical for the 6th century. Some letters were compressed (Μ, Δ, Ε), the bar over the letter Τ is short and the letter Υ is written in several ways. According to Parker the manuscript should be dated to the 7th century.

It is currently dated by the INTF to the 6th century.

=== Discovery and further research ===
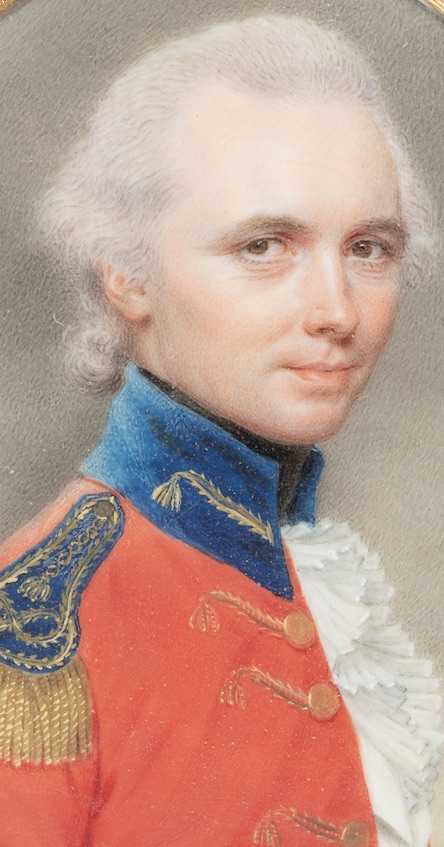
Colin Macaulay, 1792, by John Smart, by permission of the Provost & Fellows of Kings College, Cambridge

The early history of the manuscript is unknown. In 1821 it was brought by General Colin Macaulay to England from the Greek island Zakynthos in the Ionian Sea, after being presented to him by Prince Comuto (Antonios Dimitriou Komoutos, 1748-1833) a former President of the Septinsular Republic. Comuto inscribed the Codex to Macaulay as a token of his esteem. On his return to England Macaulay presented the Codex to British and Foreign Bible Society which then placed it in its library (Mss 24) in London.

Scholz saw the manuscript in 1845, and Paul de Lagarde in 1853, but they did not decipher it. The subtext of the Palimpest was partly deciphered, transcribed, and edited by the Rev. Tregelles in 1861. Tregelles used types originally cast for printing the Codex Alexandrinus, which only approximately represented the shape of the letters of the codex. The hand-written letters are smaller than the later letters. Tregelles included one page of typographical facsimile in this edition. He did not decipher the small Patristic writing and doubted that it could be read without chemical restoration.

Nicholas Pocock found errors in Tregelles' edition, but William Hatch thought it satisfactory. J. Harold Greenlee corrected Tregelles' errors and edited the list of corrections in 1957, which was examined by William Hatch. In 1959 Greenlee published a commentary. In July 2018, the manuscript was scanned using MSI technology, with the result that now the lower portion is entirely readable, and a new transcription and translation of Codex Zacynthius is available online via the Cambridge Digital Library.

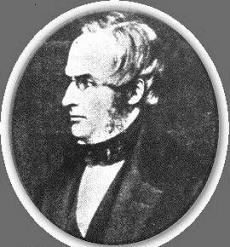
Samuel Prideaux Tregelles

Tischendorf cited the codex in his Editio Octava Critica Maior in 564 places. It is often cited in the critical editions of the Greek New Testament (UBS3, NA26, NA27).

In 1985 it was loaned to the Cambridge University Library (BFBS Ms 213). In December 2013, the Bible Society announced plans to sell some manuscripts, among them the Codex Zacynthius, to raise funds for a Visitors Centre in Wales. The University was given right of first refusal and had until February 2014 to raise the money to acquire the codex.

The public appeal raised £1.1 million and the codex was purchased by the Cambridge University Library. A full spectrographic analysis was conducted and a definitive transcription of the Palimpest then published by Professor Hugh Houghton and Professor John Parker of the University of Birmingham.

== See also ==
- List of New Testament uncials
- Textual criticism
