= Lectionary 183 =

Lectionary ℓ 183
- New Testament manuscript
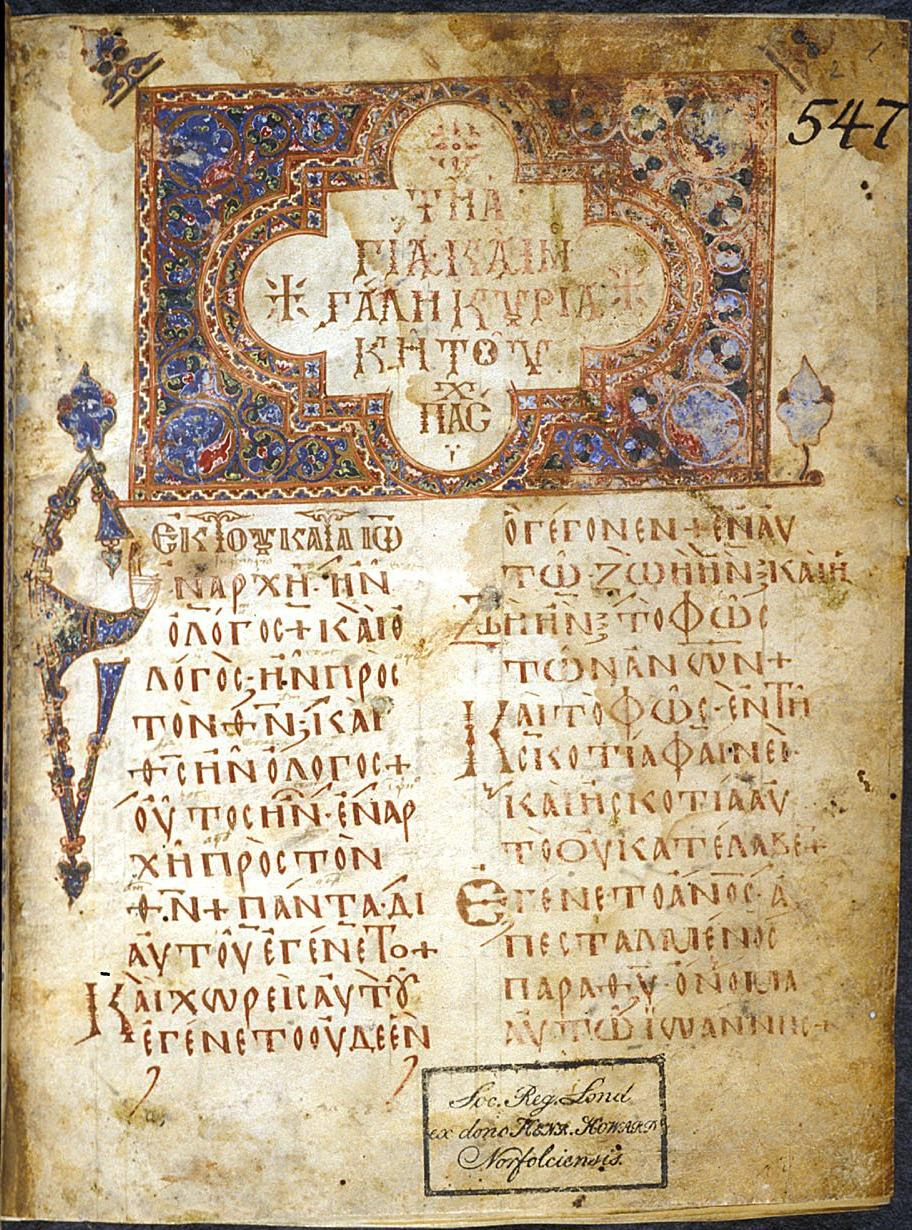
- Folio 2 recto
- Name: Arundel 547
- Text: Evangelistarion
- Date: 10th century
- Script: Greek
- Now at: British Library
- Size: 29.4 by 23.2 cm
- Type: Byzantine
- Hand: large and elegant
- Note: splendidly illuminated

Lectionary 183, designated by siglum ℓ 183 (in the Gregory-Aland numbering of New Testament manuscripts) is a Greek manuscript of the New Testament, written on parchment in uncial letters. Biblical scholars Westcott and Hort labelled it by 38^{e}, and biblical scholar Frederick H. A. Scrivener by 257^{e}. Using the study of comparative writings styles (palaeography), it has been assigned to the 10th century. The manuscript has some missing portions and gaps at the end and inside, but they were supplied by a later hand. It is faded in parts.

Textually it often agrees with old uncial manuscripts of the New Testament, but it has some unique variants. It has numerous errors, but unequally distributed in the codex. It was examined by several palaeographers.

It forms part of the British Library Arundel Manuscripts.

== Description ==
The manuscript is a codex (precursor to the modern book) containing Lessons from the Gospels of John, Matthew, Luke lectionary (Evangelistarium), on 329 parchment leaves (29.4 cm by 23.2 cm). 9 leaves of the original codex were lost, but they were supplied by a later hand on paper. The manuscript contains all the Church lessons from Easter to Pentecost, for every Saturday and Sunday for the rest of the year.

The leaf with text of John 20:19–30 is on paper, part of the first leaf (John 1:11–13) is on paper and was supplied by later hand. The supplied leaves are also written in uncial letters, but in a widely in different style, "with thicker downstrokes and very thin upstrokes".

It contains music notes and portraits of the Evangelists in colours and gold before each Gospel (folios 1v, 63v, 94v, and 131v). There are 16 headpieces in colours and gold. According to Scrivener it is splendidly illuminated. The decorations are zoomorphic (birds, fishes) or anthropomorphic (human figures, hands, other body parts), also harpies, or vases.

The text is written in Greek uncial letters, in two columns per page, 22 lines per page. The margins are wide, the text measures 24.5 by 16.5 cm. The first page is in red and gold ink, the rest pages in black ink, much faded in parts. The handwriting is large and elegant. The large initial letters are rubricated, the headpieces are decorated in colours and gold (folios 1r, 64r, 95r, 132r, and 238r). The small initials are in red ink. The breathings (rough breathing, smooth breathing), and accents are in red ink, and though they are "given correctly", it is "without any pretensions to correctness". The words are written continuously without any separation. The nomina sacra are written in an abbreviated way.

The itacistic error occurs very frequently, more often than in Codex Alexandrinus, and almost so frequently as in Codex Bezae, but they are unequally distributed over the different parts of the manuscript. The change ι into ει is not so perpetual as in these two manuscripts. There is no iota adscriptum or iota subscriptum in the codex Moveable-nu occurs almost constantly. According to Scrivener the grammatical forms of the manuscript usually are considered as Alexandrian.

There are many marks in red ink, some erasures and corrections made by a later hand. A few corrections were made by modern hand.

== Text ==
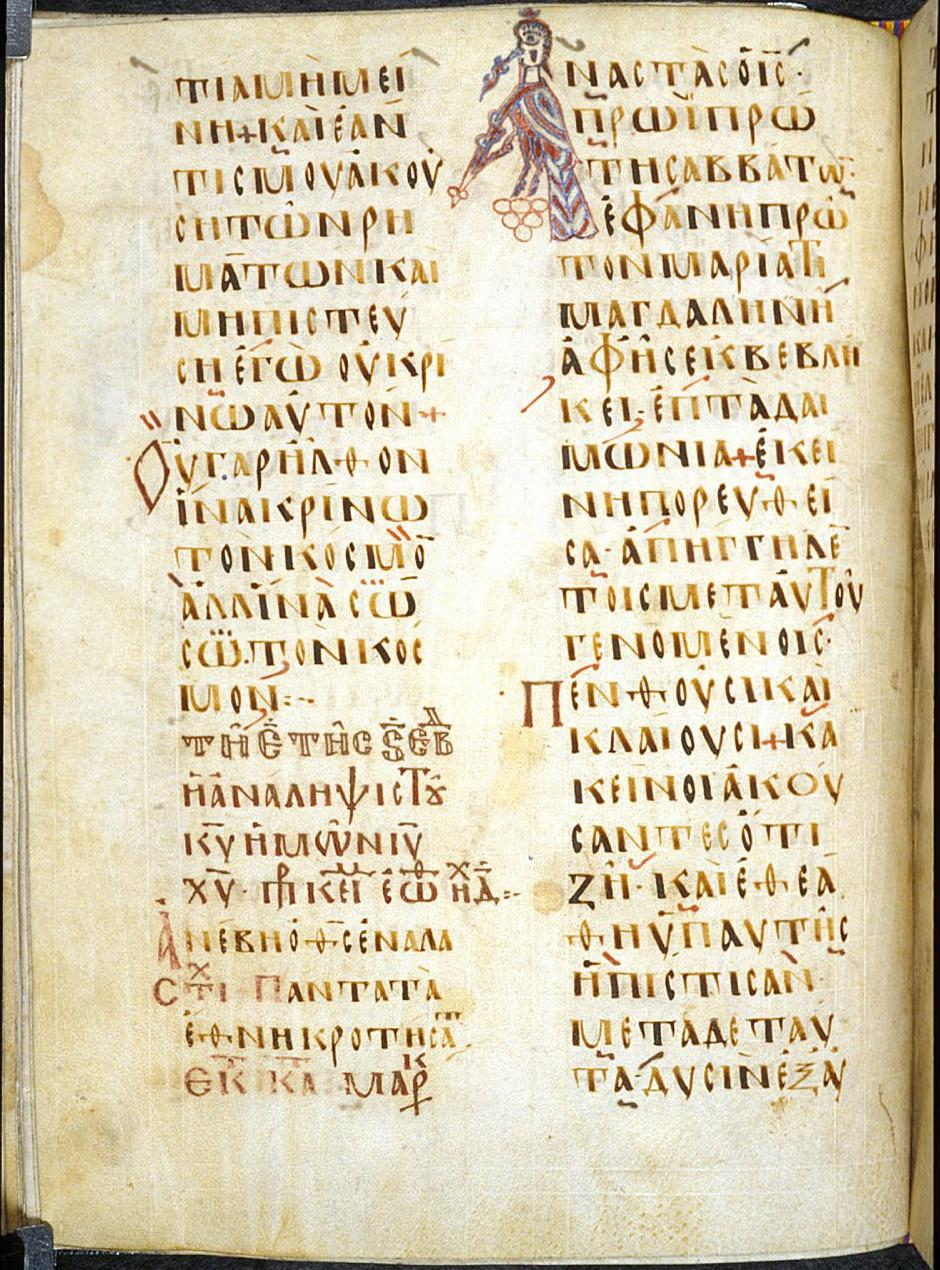
Folio 47 recto

The text of the codex is considered a representative of the Byzantine text-type and it is closer to the Textus Receptus than many other manuscript of much later date, but some readings of the codex can be found in the uncial manuscripts: Alexandrinus (A), Vaticanus (B), Ephraemi recriptus (C), Bezae (D), Cyprius (K), Regius (L), and Campianus. It agrees with these manuscripts in following texts: Matthew 6:32; 7:2.12.13; 8:18; 9:22.27; 18:14; 22:13; 23:10.25;27.28; 24:6; 26:71; 27:41.45; Mark 1:9; 13:9; 16:9; Luke 1:65; 2:25; 3:16; 4:16.25; 9:31.33; 12:7.8.11.12; 18:21.43; 22:47; 23:15.28.38.48; 24:10; John 12:34; 13:2; 19:27.

It has also a number of unique readings in following texts: Matthew 2:15; 3:16; 9:10; 17:17; 20:5; 23:35; 24:4.42.43; 27:1.56; Mark 1:7; 6:8.10.16; 12:30.32; 13:11; 15:26.33; Luke 7:24.28; John 1:29; 7:41; 8:44; 12:20.35.47; 15:8; 18:33.

Some textual variants

The words after the brackets are the readings of the codex.

Matthew 2:15 – ινα ] οπως
Matthew 3:16 – εμεινεν ] ερχομενον
Matthew 9:10 – πολλοι ] πολλαι
Matthew 17:17 – φερετε μοι αυτον ωδε ] φερετε αυτον προς με
Matthew 20:5 – ωσαυτως ] ωσαυτος
Matthew 23:35 – ελθη ] επελθη
Matthew 24:4 – μη τις υμας πλανηση ] μη πλανηθηναι
Matthew 24:42 – γρηγορειτε ] γρηγορειται
Matthew 24:43 – φυλακη ] φυλακει

== History ==
Palaeographer Josiah Forshall dated the manuscript to the 9th century (Catalogue of Manuscripts in the British Museum, 1834–1840). Scrivener stated that on the palaeographical ground it should be dated earlier, even to the 7th or 8th century, but liturgical books usually were written in an older letters than in other documents. Scrivener dated this manuscript to the 9th century. Gregory refers the manuscript even later, to the 10th century. It has been assigned by the Institute for New Testament Textual Research to the 10th century.

Its place of origin is unknown. Suggestions include the Eastern Mediterranean (Cappadocia?) or South Italy. According to the subscription it was written in the "monastery of the Holy Trinity on the island of Chalce".

The manuscript once belonged to Thomas Howard (1585–1646), 2nd earl of Arundel, 4th earl of Surrey, and 1st earl of Norfolk, an art collector and politician; he probably acquired the manuscript through his agents Petty or Thomas Roe in 1626. Then it belonged to Henry Howard (1628–1684), 6th duke of Norfolk, who presented the manuscript to the "Royal Society" in London in 1667 (along with Minuscule 476 and Lectionary 187). It was later purchased by the British Museum from the Royal Society along with more than 500 other Arundel manuscripts in 1831. Since 1973 it has been housed in the British Library.

The manuscript was examined by Richard Bentley, who made the first partial collation of the codex. The collation of Bentley is still preserved at the Trinity College (B. XVII. 8). Scrivener made its new "exact and full" collation in 1852 (together with the ℓ 184). It was published in 1853. Scrivener stated: "I regard Codex x – Lectionary 183 – as perhaps the most valuable manuscript I have collated."

The manuscript was not known for Johann Martin Augustin Scholz and it was not catalogued in his list. It was added to the list of New Testament manuscripts by Scrivener (number 257^{e}) and Caspar René Gregory (number 183^{e}). Gregory saw the manuscript in 1884. Brooke Foss Westcott and Fenton Hort labelled it by 38^{e}.

It was examined by Walter de Gray Birch and Henry Jenner, E. Maunde Thompson, J. A. Herbert, John Bradley, Kurt Weitzmann, and David Buckton. Gregory saw the manuscript in 1883. William Hatch edited one facsimile page of the codex.

The codex was rebound and renovated in 1963.

The manuscript is sporadically cited in the critical editions of the Greek New Testament (UBS3). It is not cited in UBS4.

The codex is located in the British Library (Arundel 547) at London.

== See also ==
- List of New Testament lectionaries
- Biblical manuscript
- Textual criticism
- Minuscule 71

== Bibliography ==
- Westcott in Catalogue of ancient Manuscripts in the British Museum, 1881.
