= Lectionary 48 =

Lectionary ℓ 48
- New Testament manuscript
- Text: Evangelistarion
- Date: 1055
- Script: Greek
- Now at: State Historical Museum
- Size: 38.1 cm by 28.4 cm

Lectionary 48 is a Greek manuscript of the New Testament, written on parchment. It is designated by the siglum ℓ 48 in the Gregory-Aland numbering of New Testament manuscripts. According to the colophon, it is dated to 1055 CE.

== Description ==
The manuscript is a codex (precursor to the modern book), containing weekly lessons from the Gospels of John, Matthew, and Luke (known as a lectionary / Evangelistarium), written on 250 parchment leaves (sized 38.1 cm by 28.4 cm). The text is written in two columns per page, with 24 lines per page, in Greek minuscule letters. It is replete with errors known as itacisms (the spelling of letters/diphthongs with others which were pronounced similarly), and contains musical notes.

In Mark 10:7, it omits the phrase και προσκολληθησεται προς την γυναικα αυτου (and be joined to his wife). This omission is also seen in codices Codex Sinaiticus, Vaticanus (B), Athous Lavrensis (Ψ), 892, syr^{s}, and the Gothic version.

== History ==
The manuscript was written by a monk named Peter. In 1312 it belonged to Nicephorus, Metropolitan of Crete. It was held in the Iviron monastery on the Mount Athos peninsula. The manuscript was examined by classical philologist,Christian Frederick Matthaei.

The manuscript is not cited in the critical editions of the Greek New Testament (UBS3). The manuscript is currently located in the State Historical Museum, (shelf number V. 11 S. 42) in Moscow, Russia.

== See also ==
- List of New Testament lectionaries
- Biblical manuscript
- Textual criticism
