= Lectionary 47 =

Lectionary ℓ 47
- New Testament manuscript
- Text: Evangelistarion
- Date: 10th-century
- Script: Greek
- Now at: State Historical Museum
- Size: 29 cm × 21.5 cm (11.4 in × 8.5 in)

Lectionary 47, designated by siglum ℓ 47 (in the Gregory-Aland numbering). It is a Greek manuscript of the New Testament, on parchment leaves. Palaeographically it has been assigned to the 10th-century.

== Description ==
The codex contains lessons from the Gospels of John, Matthew, Luke lectionary (Evangelistarium), on 246 parchment leaves (29 by 21.5 centimetres (11.4 in × 8.5 in)). The text is written in two columns per page, in 18 lines per page, in Greek uncial letters. Full of errors of itacism, it contains musical notes.

== History ==
The manuscript was examined by Matthaei, who described it as "barbaro scriptus est, sed ex praestantissimo exemplari".

The manuscript is not cited in the critical editions of the Greek New Testament (UBS3).

Currently the codex is located in the State Historical Museum, (V. 11, S. 42) in Moscow.

== See also ==
- List of New Testament lectionaries
- Biblical manuscript
- Textual criticism
