= Codex Regius (New Testament) =

8th century Greek uncial manuscript of the 4 canonical gospels

Uncial 019
- New Testament manuscript
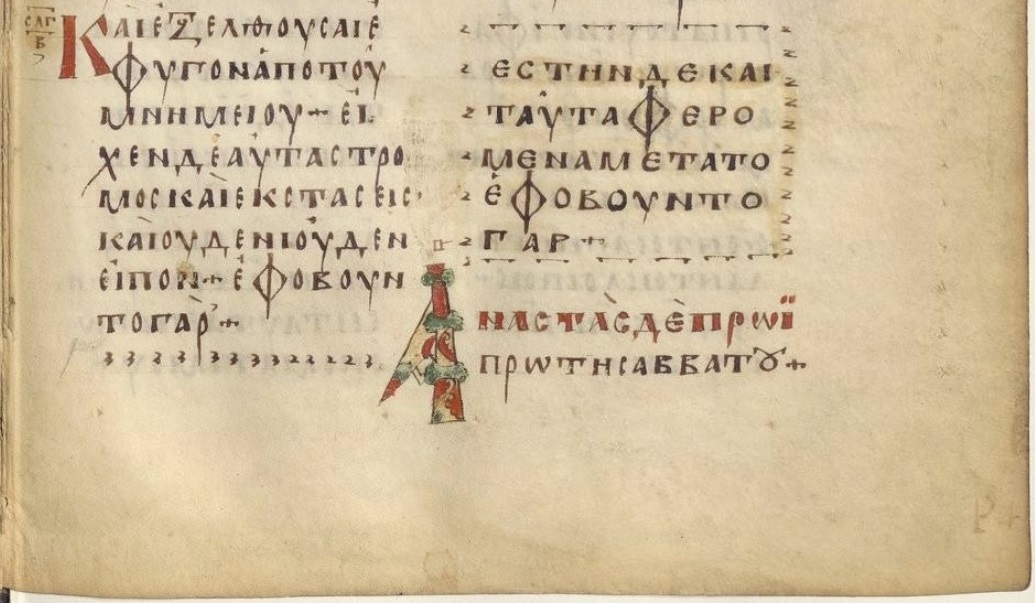
- Double Ending of Mark
- Name: Regius
- Sign: L^{e}
- Text: Gospels
- Date: 8th century
- Script: Greek
- Now at: National Library of France
- Size: 23.5 cm by 17 cm
- Type: Alexandrian text-type
- Category: II
- Hand: badly written
- Note: marginalia

Codex Regius is a Greek uncial manuscript of the New Testament written on parchment. It is designated by siglum L^{e} or 019 in the Gregory-Aland numbering of New Testament manuscripts, and ε56 in the von Soden numbering of New Testament manuscripts. Using the study of comparative writing styles (palaeography), it has been assigned to the 8th century. The manuscript has several gaps. Textual critic Frederick H. A. Scrivener described it as "by far the most remarkable document of its age and class."

== Description ==
The manuscript is a codex (precursor to the modern book) containing an almost complete text of the four Gospels on 257 thick parchment leaves (23.5 cm by 17 cm). The following portions are missing due to the loss of several leaves/pages: Matt 4:22-5:14, 28:17-20, Mark 10:16-30, 15:2-20, and John 21:15-25.

The text is written in two columns per page, 25 lines per page, in large but not rounded uncial letters using black and brown ink. It has breathing marks (utilised to designate vowel emphasis), and accents (used to indicate voiced pitch changes) often added wrongly. Initials for the ekthesis (offset letters to the left of the main margin, marking start of paragraphs) are ornamented and written in red, green, blue and yellow ink. Scrivener describes it as "carelessly written by an ignorant scribe". According to him the letter φ (phi) is enormously large, and the letter α (alpha) presents the last stage of the uncial script. He also surmises it was badly written by the copyist, who was probably more Egyptian rather than Greek, who had a tendency for writing Coptic rather than Greek letters. Quotations from the Old Testament are indicated. Decorated headpieces are present for each Gospel.

The text is divided according to the chapters (known as κεφαλαια / kephalaia), whose numbers are given in the margin, and their titles (known as τιτλοι / titloi) written at the top of the pages. It also contains the table of contents (also known as κεφαλαια) before each Gospel except John. There is also another division according to the Ammonian sections, with references to the Eusebian Canons (early systems of dividing the four Gospels into different sections) in the margin. Lectionary markings are contained in the margin for liturgical readings (these being dates in the yearly Church calendar where specific passages are read).

It has John 7:53-8:11 omitted, and there are two endings to the Gospel of Mark (as in codices Ψ 099 0112 274^{mg} 579 Lectionary 1602), a shorter one appearing before the traditional verses 16:9-20.

The text of this "shorter" ending is translated as follows:

But they [the women] reported briefly to Peter and those with him all that they had been told. And after this, Jesus himself sent out by means of them, from east to west, the sacred and imperishable proclamation of eternal salvation.

== Text ==
The Greek text of this codex is considered a representative of the Alexandrian text-type in its late stadium. The text-types are groups of different New Testament manuscripts which share specific or generally related readings, which then differ from each other group, and thus the conflicting readings can separate out the groups. These are then used to determine the original text as published; there are three main groups with names: Alexandrian, Western, and Byzantine. It contains a large number of Byzantine readings in the Gospel of Matthew (specifically in 1:1–17:26). Textual critic Kurt Aland placed it in Category II of his New Testament classification system. Category II manuscripts are described as being manuscripts "of a special quality, i.e., manuscripts with a considerable proportion of the early text, but which are marked by alien influences. These influences are usually of smoother, improved readings, and in later periods by infiltration by the Byzantine text." According to scholar Frederik Wisse, who examined Luke 1; 10; 20, the text is a "core member" of the Alexandrian text. It was noted in the 19th century that there is strong resemblance to Codex Vaticanus (B), to the citations of Origen, and to the marginal readings of the Harklean Syriac.

Omissions

Matthew 12:47

omit - L א B 1009 ℓ 12 ff^{1} k syr^{c}^{, s} cop^{sa})
incl. - Majority of manuscripts

Matthew 20:23

και το βαπτισμα ο εγω βαπτιζομαι βαπτισθησεσθε (and be baptized with the baptism that I am baptized with) - L א B D Z Θ 085 ƒ^{1} ƒ^{13} it syr^{s, c} cop^{sa}

Matthew 23:38

ερημος (desert)

omit - L B ℓ 184
incl. - Majority of manuscripts

Luke 9:55–56

καὶ εἶπεν, Οὑκ οἴδατε οἵου πνεύματος ἑστε ὐμεῖς; ὀ γὰρ υἰὸς τοῦ ἁνθρώπου οὑκ ἦλθεν ψυχὰς ἁνθρώπων ἁπολέσαι ἁλλὰ σῶσαι (and He said: "You do not know what manner of spirit you are of; for the Son of man came not to destroy men's lives but to save them) - L א B C Θ Ξ 33 700 892 1241 syr, cop^{bo}

Luke 11:4

αλλα ρυσαι ημας απο του πονηρου (but deliver us from evil) - L 𝔓^{75} א B ƒ^{1} 700 vg syr^{s} cop^{sa, bo} arm geo.

Other verses omitted are: Mark 7:16, Mark 9:44, Mark 9:46, Mark 11:26, Luke 17:36, and John 5:4.

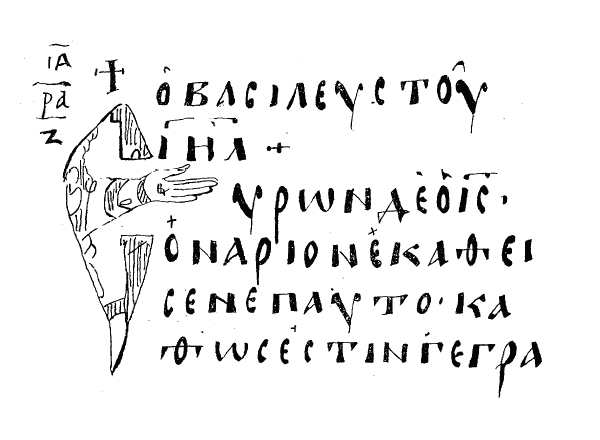
John 12:13-14 (facsimile); the initial for epsilon has motif with a blessing hand

Additions

Matthew 10:12

λεγοντες ειρηνη τω οικω τουτω - L א*^{,2} D W Θ ƒ^{1} 1010 it vg^{cl}
αυτην - Majority of manuscripts

Matthew 27:49

ἄλλος δὲ λαβὼν λόγχην ἒνυξεν αὐτοῦ τὴν πλευράν, καὶ ἐξῆλθεν ὖδορ καὶ αἳμα (the other took a spear and pierced His side, and immediately came out water and blood see John 19:34) - L א B C Γ 1010 1293 vg^{mss})
omit - Majority of manuscripts

John 20:31

ζωην αιωνιον - L א C* D Ψ 0100 ƒ^{13} it vg^{mss} syr^{p, h} cop^{sa} cop^{bo}
ζωην - Majority of manuscripts

Some other readings

Matthew 1:10

Αμων - L W ƒ^{13} Byz
Αμως א B C

Matthew 19:16

διδασκαλε (teacher) - L א B D ƒ^{1} 892^{txt} 1010 1365 ℓ 5 it^{a, d, e, ff1} cop^{bo} eth geo Origen, Hilary.

Matt 19:29

πολλαπλασιονα (manifold) - L B 1010
εκατονπλασιονα (hundredfold) - Majority of manuscripts

Luke 4:17

καὶ ἀνοίξας τὸ βιβλίον (and opened the book) - L A B W Ξ 33 892 1195 1241 ℓ 547 sy^{s, h, pal} sa bo
καὶ ἀναπτύξας τὸ βιβλίον (and unrolled the book) - א D^{c} K Δ Θ Π Ψ ƒ^{1} ƒ^{13} 28 565 700 1009 1010 Byz

Luke 14:5

ὄνος ἢ βοῦς - L א K X Π Ψ ƒ^{1} ƒ^{13} 33 892 1071 ℓ 547
υἱὸς ἢ βοῦς - Majority of manuscripts

Luke 22:1

ηγγισεν - L D
εγγιζεν - Majority of manuscripts

It contains Luke 22:43–44 (the agony), omitted by other Alexandrian witnesses.

== History ==
The early history of the manuscript is unknown. The text of the codex was cited by scholar Robert Estienne as η' in his Editio Regia (an early edition of the Greek New Testament). It was loosely collated by textual critic Johann Jakob Wettstein. Textual critic Johann Jakob Griesbach set a very high value on the codex. It was edited in 1846 by textual critic Constantin von Tischendorf (in the publication Monumenta sacra inedita), but with some errors.

The codex is now located in the National Library of France (Gr. 62), in Paris.

== See also ==
- List of New Testament uncials
- Textual criticism
