= Lectionary 269 =

Lectionary ℓ 269
- New Testament manuscript
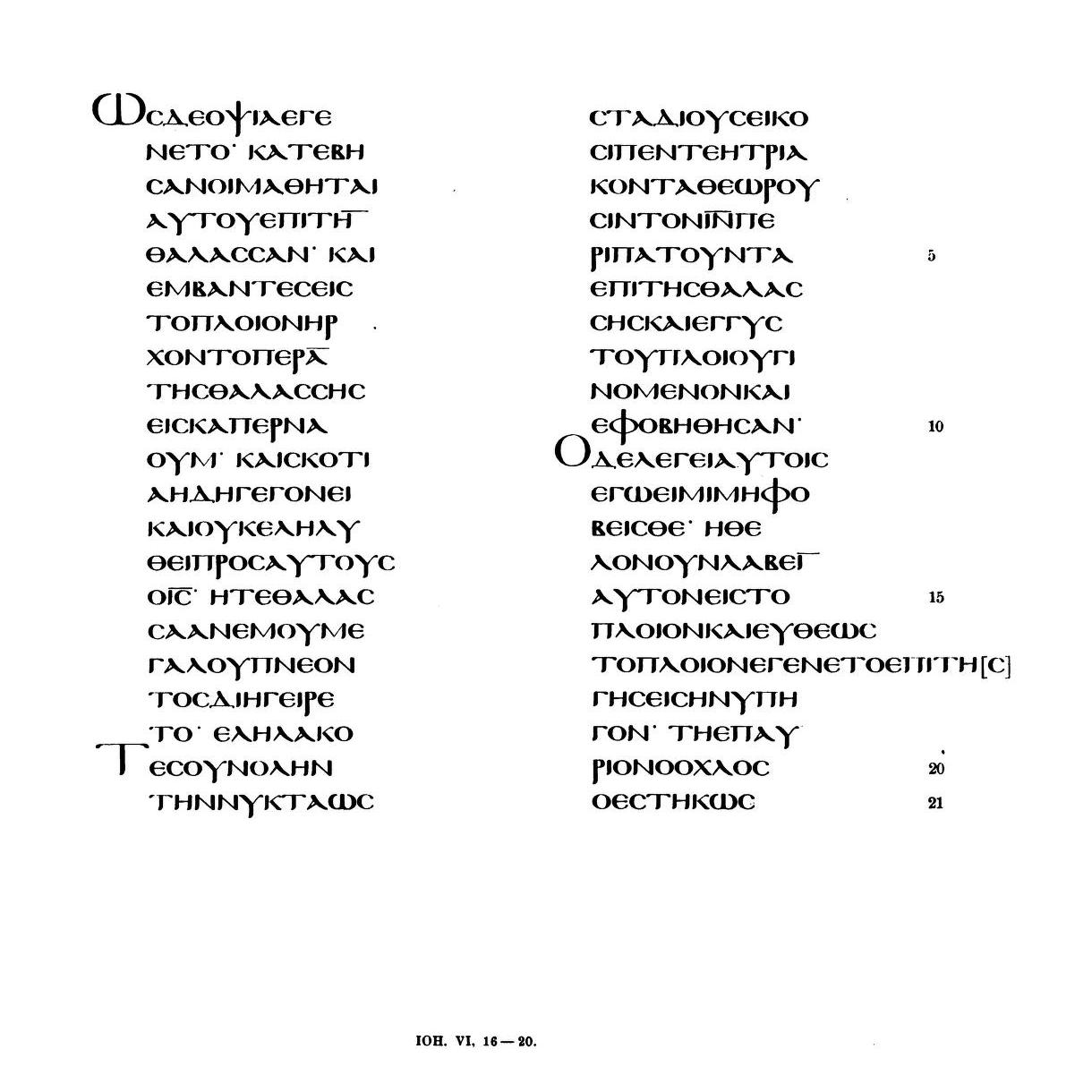
- Tischendorf's facsimile edition
- Name: Fragmenta Veneta Evangelistarii Palimpsesti
- Text: Evangelistarium
- Date: 8th century
- Script: Greek
- Now at: Biblioteca Marciana
- Cite: Tischendorf, Monumenta sacra inedita (1855)
- Size: 23.3 cm by 17.8 cm
- Type: Byzantine text-type
- Note: palimpsest

Lectionary 269, designated by siglum ℓ 269 (in the Gregory-Aland numbering) is a Greek manuscript of the New Testament, on parchment. Palaeographically it has been assigned to the 8th century. Scrivener labelled it as 175^{e}, Gregory by 269^{e}. It is a palimpsest, both the lower (older) and the upper (younger) text of palimpsest are the texts of New Testament lectionary. The manuscript has survived in a fragmentary condition.

== Description ==
It is a palimpsest, nearly illegible. The lower text belongs to lectionary 269, the upper text belongs to lectionary 1944. The text of ℓ 269 contains lessons from the Matthew 8:32–9:1; 9:9–13; Gospel of John 2:15–22; 3:22–26; 6:16–26 (Evangelistarium).

The text is written in Greek large uncial letters, on 4 parchment leaves (23.3 cm by 17.8 cm), in two columns per page, 21 lines per page. It has not accents, but there is some punctuation.

The error of itacism occurs, like interchange between Ι and ΕΙ, Ε and ΑΙ, Η and ΕΙ, Η and Ι (e.g. ΕΛΛΗΝΗΣΤΙ), ΟΙ and Υ, Ο and Ω (ΠΡΑΙΤΟΡΙΟΝ, ΣΤΑΥΡΩΝ).

The nomina sacra are written in an abbreviated way, there are also some abbreviations at the end of line.

ℓ 1944 is written in two columns per page, 30 lines per page. It is dated to the 13th century.

== Text ==
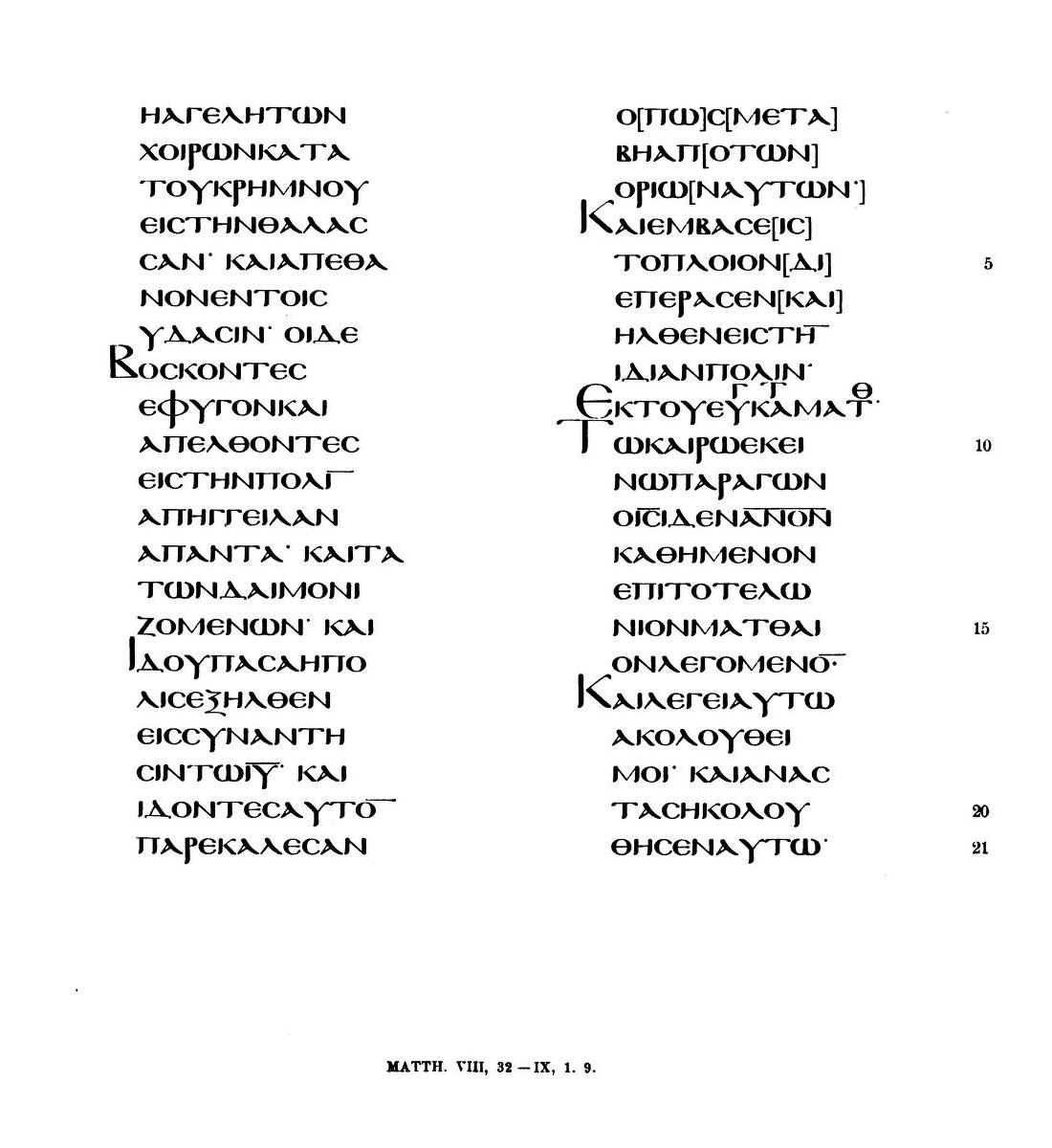
Page of the codex with text of Matthew 8:32–9:1.9 (Tischendorf's facsimile)

The Greek text of the codex is a representative of the Byzantine text-type. It is very close to the Byzantine uncial manuscripts: E, F, G, H, K, M, S, U, and V. Manuscripts E, F, G, H, S, U belong to the textual family E, one of the oldest families of the Byzantine text-type.

Matthew 8:32–34 ΝΑΓΕΛΗΤΩΝ ΧΟΙΡΩΝΚΑΤΑ ΤΟΥΚΡΗΜΝΟΥ ΕΙΣΤΗΝΘΑΛΛΑΣ ΣΑΝ^{.} ΚΑΙΑΠΘΑ ΝΟΝΕΝΤΟΙΣ ΥΔΑΣΙΝ^{.} ΟΙΔΕ ΒΟΣΚΟΝΤΕΣ ΕΦΥΓΟΝΚΑΙ ΑΠΕΛΘΟΝΤΕΣ ΕΙΣΤΗΝΠΟΛΙ̅ ΑΠΗΓΓΕΙΛΑΝ ΑΠΑΝΤΑ^{.} ΚΑΙΤΑ ΤΩΝΔΑΙΜΟΝΙ ΖΟΜΕΝΩΝ^{.} ΚΑΙ ΙΔΟΥΠΑΣΑΗΠΟ ΛΙΣΕΞΛΘΕΝ ΕΙΣΣΥΝΑΝΤΗ ΣΙΝΤΩΙ̅Υ̅^{.} ΚΑΙ ΙΔΟΝΤΕΣΑΥΤΟ̅ ΠΑΡΕΚΑΛΕΣΑΝ	Matthew 8:34–9:1.9 Ο[ΠΩ]Σ[ΜΕΤΑ] ΒΗΑΠ[ΟΤΩΝ] ΟΡΙΩ[ΝΑΥΤΩΝ] ΚΑΙΕΜΒΑΣΕ[ΙΣ] ΤΟΠΛΟΙΟΝ[ΔΙ] ΕΠΕΡΑΣΕΝ[ΚΑΙ] ΗΛΘΕΝΕΙΣΤΗ ΙΔΙΑΝΠΟΛΙΝ ΕΚΤΟΥΕΥΚΑΜΑΤ ΤΩΚΑΙΡΩΕΚΕΙ ΝΩΠΑΡΑΓΩΝ ΟΙΣΙΔΕΝΑΝΟΝ ΚΑΘΗΜΕΝΟΝ ΕΠΙΤΟΤΕΛΩ ΝΙΟΝΜΑΤΘΑΙ ΟΝΛΕΓΟΜΕΝΟ ΚΑΙΛΕΓΕΙΑΥΤΩ ΑΚΟΛΟΥΘΕΙ ΜΟΙ^{.} ΚΑΙΑΝΑΣ ΤΑΣΗΚΟΛΟΥ ΘΕΣΕΝΑΥΤΩ

In Matthew 9:13 it has textual reading αλλα αμαρτωλους εις μετανοιαν (Textus Receptus has αλλ' αμαρτωλους εις μετανοιαν, NA26 has αλλα αμαρτωλους);

In John 2:17 it has reading καταφαγεται με (as Alexandrian text), Textus Receptus reads καταφαγεν με;

In John 2:19 it has reading απεκριθη ΙΣ (as Alexandrian text), Textus Receptus reads απεκριθη ο Ισους;

In John 2:22 it has reading ελεγεν (as Alexandrian text), Textus Receptus reads ελεγεν αυτοις;

In John 3:23 it has reading βαπτιζων εγγυς του Σαλειμ, Textus Receptus (and Alexandrian text) reads βαπτιζων εν Αινων εγγυς του Σαλειμ;

In John 3:24 it has reading εις φυλακην, Textus Receptus (and Alexandrian text) reads εις την φυλακην; the reading of the codex is supported by the manuscripts E and M;

In John 3:25 it has reading μετα Ιουδαιου (as Alexandrian text), Textus Receptus reads μετα Ιουδαιων;

In John 6:19 it has reading εληλακοτες ουν ολην την νυκτα ως, Textus Receptus (and Alexandrian text) reads εληλακοτες ουν ως;

In John 6:24 it has reading ενεβησαν αυτοι (as Alexandrian text), Textus Receptus reads ενεβησαν και αυτοι;

== History ==
Constantin von Tischendorf dated the manuscript to the 7th century. According to him it was written before the 9th century, and is one of the oldest lectionary Gospels (Evangelistarion). Scrivener and Gregory dated the manuscript to the 7th or 8th century. It has been assigned by the Institute for New Testament Textual Research to the 8th century.

The manuscript was examined by Scholz. The manuscript was added to the list of New Testament manuscripts by Scrivener (number 175^{e}) and Gregory (number 269^{e}). Gregory saw the manuscript in 1886.

The text of the codex was deciphered and edited by Tischendorf in Monumenta sacra inedita (1855).

The manuscript is not cited in the critical editions of the Greek New Testament (UBS3).

The codex is housed at the Biblioteca Marciana (Gr. I.49 (1213), fol. 251–254) in Venice.

== See also ==
- List of New Testament lectionaries
- Biblical manuscript
- Textual criticism
- Lectionary 268

== Bibliography ==
- Constantin von Tischendorf, Fragmenta Veneta Evangelistarii Palimpsesti, in: Monumenta sacra inedita (Leipzig 1855), vol. I, pp. XXXVIII-XXXX, 199–210.
- Gregory, Caspar René (1900). Textkritik des Neuen Testaments, Vol. 1. Leipzig. p. 410.
