= Cataldo =

Cataldo may refer to:

- Cataldo (name), given name and a surname
- Cataldo, Idaho, unincorporated community in Idaho, United States
- Cataldo Mission, National Historic Landmark in Cataldo, Idaho
- Cataldo 'ndrina, clan of the 'Ndrangheta, a criminal and mafia-type organisation in Calabria, Italy
- Cataldo Ambulance Service, ambulance services in the Greater Boston and North Shore areas in the U.S. Commonwealth of Massachusetts

== See also ==
- Catald
- Cataldi
- San Cataldo (disambiguation)
