= Family E =

Family E is a textual group of the New Testament manuscripts. It belongs to the Byzantine text-type as one of its textual families, it is one of the primary early families of the Byzantine text-type. The name of the family came from the symbol of Codex Basilensis, the lead manuscript of the family, which is designated by symbol E (von Soden's K^{i}).

== Description ==
Hermann von Soden discovered the family and designated it with symbol K^{i}. According to him it is one of the earliest families of the Byzantine text-type, it is a result of recension made by Lucian of Antioch. To this family Soden included, as the leading members of it, manuscripts: Codex Boreelianus (F), Codex Seidelianus I (G), and Codex Seidelianus II (H).

Codex Seidelianus I seems slightly less Byzantine than the rest, and Codex Basilensis seems closer to the basic form of the Byzantine text.

Jacob Greelings includes to this family variants from Codex Vaticanus 354, Codex Mosquensis II, minuscules 44, 65, 98, 219, and 422. The Gothic Version made by Wulfila stays with close relationship to this Byzantine sub-family. Greelings classified in this group Codex Nanianus (U), but Frederik Wisse excluded U from this group while suggesting 271 should be added.

Greelings assigned manuscripts E, F, G, H as a core members of the group. Unfortunately all these manuscripts have survived in a fragmentary condition, it makes classification and restoration the text of the family more difficult.

According to Claremont Profile Method in the three test chapters of the Gospel of Luke, manuscripts E, F, G, H did not have sufficient consistency to demonstrate its existence as an independent textual group. Wisse included them to the textual family K^{x}. Family e (Soden's K^{i}) becomes Wisse's textual cluster Ω, an early form of K^{x}. Wisse confirmed statement of Soden that it is an early form of K^{x}. But Wisse used small sample size (three chapters of Luke), based on the age alone, it appears that K^{i} is independent of K^{x}. The text of the manuscripts could involved.

The agreement with Textus Receptus in Mark 4 is 94.5%.

Some uncial lectionaries represent the text of this family (e.g. Lectionary 269).

The Text of Matthew 16:2b-3 (signs of the time); Christ's agony at Gethsemane (Luke 22:43-44) i Pericope adulterae (John 7:53-8:11) are marked by an asterisk (※).

== Group profile in Luke 20 ==
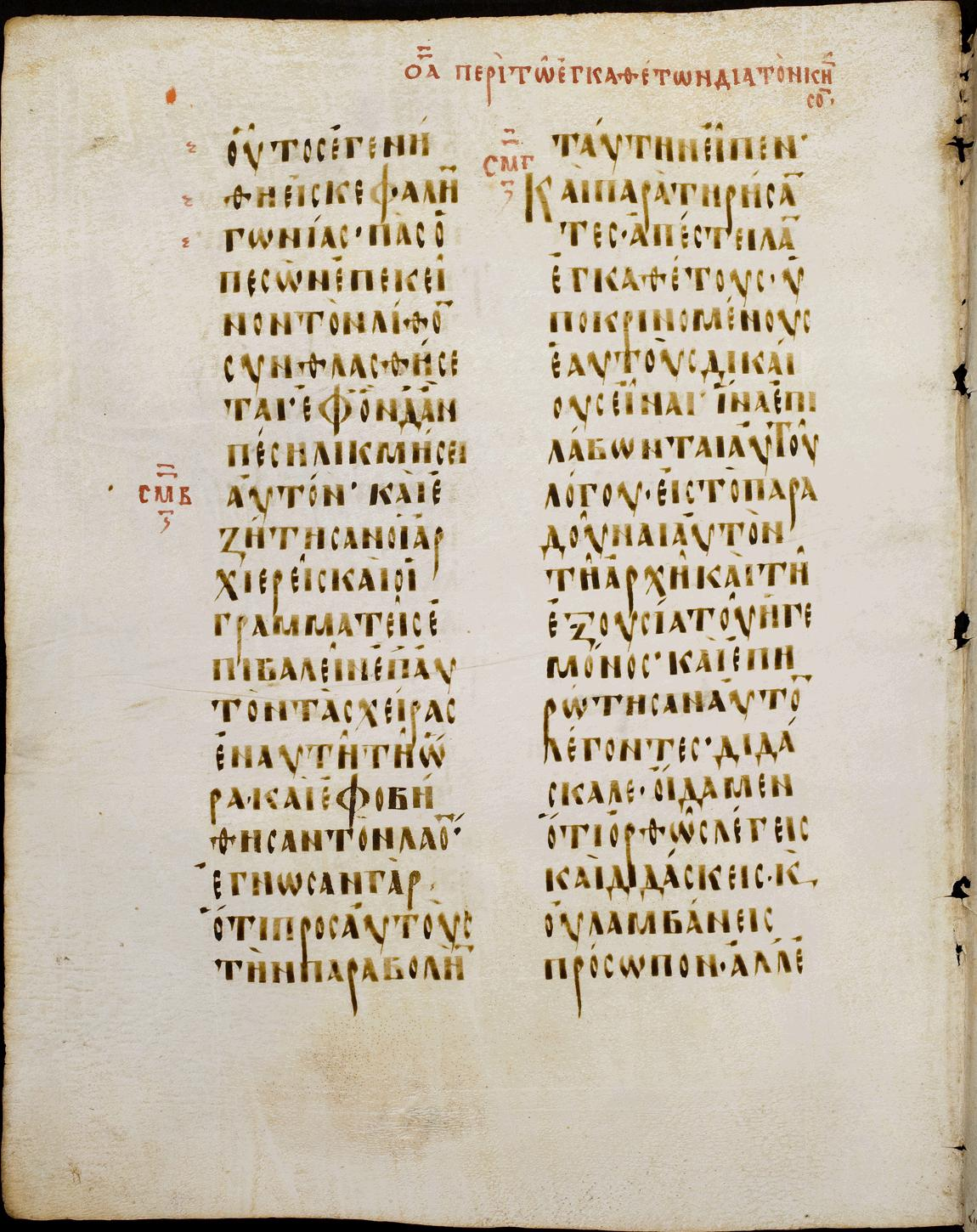
Page from Codex Boreelianus with text of Luke 20:17-21

The readings before bracket are the reading of Textus Receptus, the readings after bracket are the readings of the family.

Verse 1 εκεινων ] omit

Verse 1 εν τω ιερω ] omit

Verse 1 αρχιερεις και οι γραμματεις ] γραμματεις και οι αρχιερεις

Verse 1 αρχιερεις ] ιερεις

Verse 2 και ειπον ] omit

Verse 2 προς αυτον λεγοντες ] λεγοντες προς αυτον

Verse 2 ειπε ] ειπον

Verse 3 υμας καγω ] καγω υμας

Verse 3 ενα λογον ] λογον ενα

Verse 3 ενα ] omit

Verse 5 συνελογισαντο ] διελογισαντο

Verse 5 οτι ] omit

Verse 5 ουν ] omit

Verse 6 πας ο λαος ] ο λαος απας

Verse 6 ειναι ] γεγονεναι

Verse 7 ειδεναι ] ειδεναι το

Verse 7 ποθεν ] omit

Verse 8 και ο ] ο δε

Verse 9 τις ] omit

Verse 10 εν ] τω

Verse 10 εν ] εν τω

Verse 10 απο του καρπου του αμπελονος δωσιν αυτω ] λαβη απο του καρπου του αμπελονος

Verse 10 εξαπεστειλαν ] απεστειλαν

Verse 12 και τουνον ] κακεινον

Verse 13 ιδοντες ] omission

Verse 14 διελογιζοντο ] διελογισαντο

Verse 14 εαυτους ] αλληλους

Verse 14 δευτε ] omission

Verse 14 ινα ημων γενηται ] και ημων εστι

Verse 15 αυτον ] omit

Verse 16 τουτους ] εκεινους

Verse 18 επ ] εις

Verse 19 αρχιερεις και οι γραμματεις ] γραμματεις και οι αρχιερεις

Verse 19 τας χειρας ] την χειρα

Verse 19 τον λαον ] omit

Verse 19 τον λαον ] τον οχλον

Verse 19 την παραβολην ταυτην ειπε ] ειπε παραβολην ταυτην

Verse 22 ημιν ] ημας

Verse 22 φορον ] φορους

Verse 22 δουναι ] διδοναι

Verse 23 τι με πειραζετε ] omit

Verse 24 επιδειξατε ] δειξατε

Verse 24 δηναριον ] δηναριον οι δε εδειξαν και ειπε

Verse 24 δε ] omission

Verse 25 αυτοις ] προς αυτους

Verse 25 αποδοτε τοινυν ] τοινυν αποδοτε

Verse 25 καισαρος ] καισαρος τω

Verse 27 αντιλεγοντες ] λεγοντες

Verse 27 επηρωτησαν ] επηρωτουν

Verse 28 μωσης ] μωυσης

Verse 28 αποθανη ] η

Verse 28 λαβη ο αδελφος αυτου ] ο αδελφος αυτου λαβη

Verse 29 ησαν ] ησαν παρ ημιν

Verse 31 αυτην ] αυτην ωσαυτως

Verse 31 και ] omit

Verse 31 και απεθανον ] omit

Verse 32 δε ] omit

Verse 32 παντων ] omit

Verse 33 ουν αναστασει ] αναστασει ουν

Verse 33 γινεται ] εσται

Verse 34 εκγαμισκονται ] εκγαμιζονται

Verse 35 εκγαμισκονται ] εκγαμιζονται

Verse 36 ετι ] omit

Verse 36 εισι ] omit

Verse 37 μωσης ] μωυσης

Verse 37 εμηνυσεν ] εμνημονευσεν

Verse 39 ειπας ] λεγεις

Verse 40 επερωταν ] επερωτησαι

Verse 40 ουδεν ] ουδε εν

Verse 41 λεγουσι ] λεγουσι τινες

Verse 41 τον Χριστον υιον Δαβιδ ειναι ] οι γραμματεις οτι ο χριστος υιος δαδ εστιν

Verse 42 και αυτος ] αυτος γαρ

Verse 42 βιβλω ] βιβλω των

Verse 44 κυριον αυτον ] αυτον κυριον

Verse 44 υιος αυτου ] αυτου υιος

Verse 46 περιπατειν εν στολαις ] εν στολαις περιπατειν

Verse 47 κατεσθιουσι ] κατεσθιοντες

Verse 47 προσευχονται ] προσευχομενοι

== See also ==
Families of the Byzantine text-type

- Family Π
- Family K^{1}
- Family K^{r}
- Family K^{x}

Families associated with the Byzantine text

- Family 1424
- Family 1739
