= Cataldo (name) =

Cataldo is both an Italian personal name and surname. Notable people with the name include:

== Given name ==
- Catald, saint
- Cataldo Agostinelli (1894–1988), Italian mathematician
- Cataldo Amodei (1649–1693), Italian composer
- Cataldo Cozza (born 1985), Italian-German footballer
- Cataldo Salerno (born 1951), Italian politician

== Surname ==
- Dario Cataldo (born 1985), Italian cyclist
- Dominick Cataldo (1923–1997), Sicilian-American mafioso
- Giuseppe Cataldo (1938–2011), Italian gangster of the Cataldo 'ndrina
- Joseph Cataldo (1837–1928), Italian-American Jesuit, founder of Gonzaga University
- Michael Cataldo (born 1965), American politician in Iowa
- Nicolás Cataldo (born 1984), Chilean politician
- Philippe Cataldo (born 1954) French singer

== See also ==
- Cataldo (disambiguation)
- Cataldi
- San Cataldo (disambiguation)
