= Codex Boreelianus =

Uncial bible manuscript

Uncial 09
- New Testament manuscript
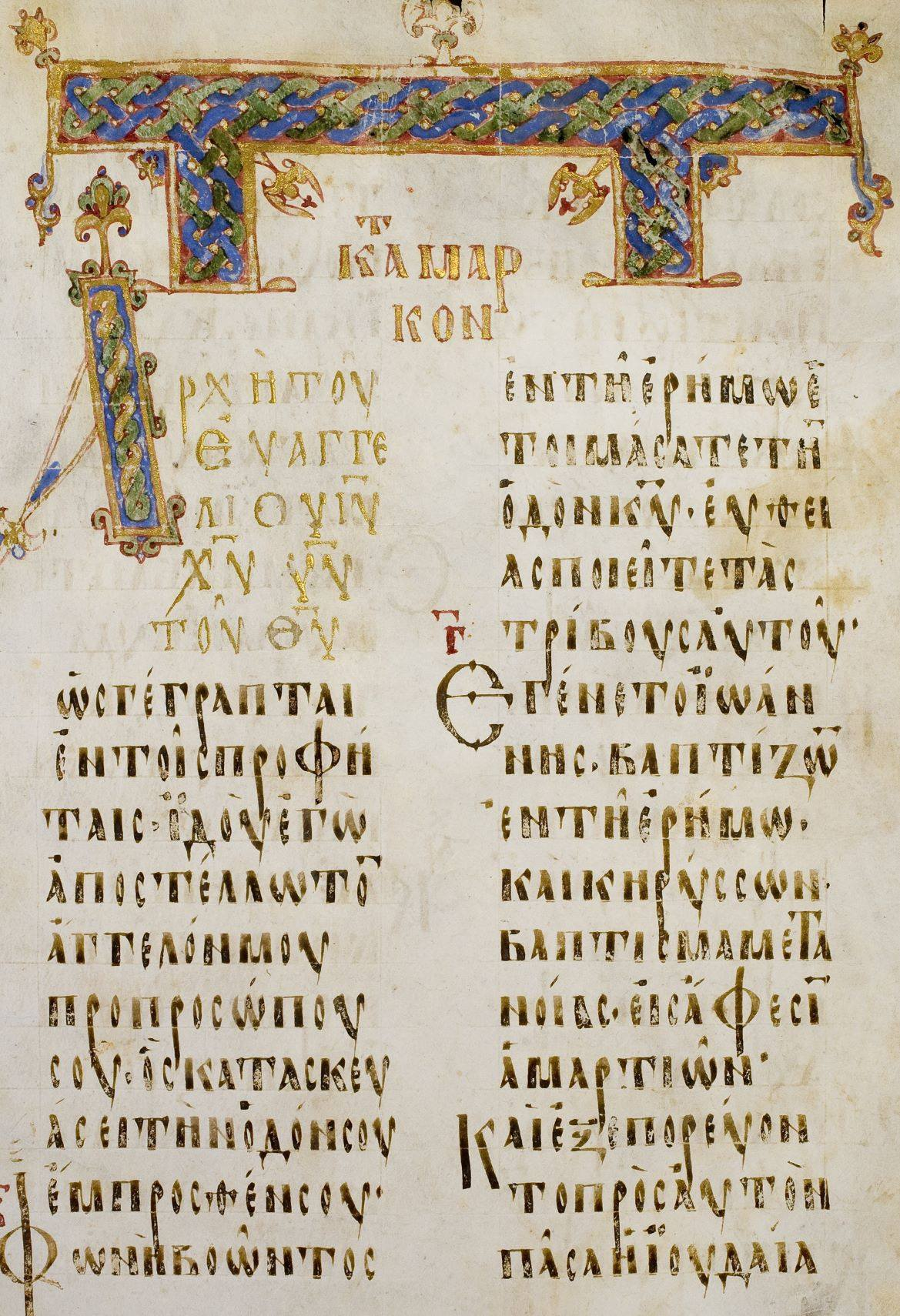
- Beginning of Mark, decorated headpiece and initial
- Name: Boreelianus Rheno-Trajectinus
- Sign: F^{e}
- Text: Gospels†
- Date: c. 875–975
- Script: Greek
- Found: Johann Boreel
- Now at: Utrecht University
- Size: 28.5 × 22 cm (11.2 × 8.7 in)
- Type: Byzantine text-type
- Category: V
- Hand: careful and elegant
- Note: unfoliated

Codex Boreelianus, or its full name Codex Boreelianus Rheno-Trajectinus, is a uncial manuscript of the New Testament Gospels in Greek, written on parchment. It is designated by F^{e} or 09 in the Gregory-Aland numbering of New Testament manuscripts, and ε 86 in the von Soden numbering of New Testament manuscripts. It is full of gaps, many of which arose between 1751 and 1830. The codex was named Boreelianus after Johannes Boreel (1577–1629), who brought it from the East.

The text of the codex represents the majority of the text (Byzantine text-type), but with numerous alien readings (non-Byzantine). Some of its readings do not occur in any other manuscript (so called singular readings). According to the present textual critics its text is not very important, but it is cited in all modern editions of the Greek New Testament.

The manuscript was brought from the East at the beginning of the 17th century. It was in private hands for over 100 years. Since 1830 it has been housed at the Utrecht University.

== Description ==
The manuscript is a codex (precursor to the modern book), containing the text of the four Gospels on 204 parchment leaves (sized 28.5 × 22 cm (11.2 × 8.7 in)), with numerous gaps. The text of the existing codex begins with Matthew 9:1 and ends with John 13:34. Luke is even more incomplete. Textual critic Johann J. Wettstein remarked in 1751 that the codex started at Matthew 7:6 and only the folia up to Matthew 8:25 and Mark 11:6–16 were missing. Hence several folios appear to have gone missing since his time and the present.

The leaves are unbound and are kept in loose quires. The text is written in the late uncial script of the larger type, in two columns per page, with mostly 19 lines per column. The graphic writing style of the text (according to palaeography) is close to Codex Seidelianus I. The letters Η, Μ, Ν, and Π, are square, the letters Ε, Θ, Ο, Σ, and Φ have a round shape. The letters Δ, Ε, Θ, Ο, and especially Ψ in cruciform, are of the form characteristic for the late uncial script. Φ is large and bevelled at both ends. The letters were written by an 'elegant and careful' hand. The breathings (rough and smooth breathing) and accents (see e.g. Greek diacritics) are given fully and usually correctly. The breathings are indicated by sigla ⊢ and ⊣, often used in codices from the 9th and 10th century. In some cases breathings are given incorrectly (e.g. Matthew 9,7.16). The codex has a lot of grammatical errors, like hiatus (e.g. νηστευουσιν in Matthew 9:14, ελεγεν in Matthew 9:21, ειπεν in Matthew 9:22, etc.) and inclusion of final nu. The error of iotacism occurs infrequently.

The text is divided according to the Ammonian Sections (an early division of the four Gospels into easily referenced sections), with the section number written in the left margin, but there are given without references to the Eusebian Canons (another early section division based on the Ammonian). There is no division according to the chapters (known as κεφαλαια / kephalia), however the titles (known as τιτλοι / titloi) are given at the top of the pages, sometimes also at the bottom. The capitals at the beginning of the sections stand out in the margin to indicate new sections (as also seen in codices Alexandrinus, Ephraemi, and Basilensis. Although there is no division according to the κεφαλαια, the table contents of the chapters (also known as κεφαλαια) are placed before each Gospel (though unknown whether this was true in Matthew, due to missing first few folios). It has some lectionary markings at the margin.

The headpieces are decorated, with headings written in gold and red ink; in some places nicely decorated initial letters can be found (also in red or gold ink). The Ammonian sections are written in red. The pages are numbered; the Greek quire numbers are still found at the top right of some pages. At the top left of the first page of most quires in the Gospel of Matthew, Arabic quire numbers are found. There are several different correctors, among which the "first hand" worked on the codex, but the total number of corrections is not high.

The manuscript employs the nomina sacra (sacred names; an early Christian abbreviation system for names/titles considered sacred) for the following words: Θ̅Σ̅ / θεος / theos (God), Ι̅Σ̅ / Ιησους / Iesous (Jesus), Χ̅Σ̅ / χριστος / christos (Christ), Κ̅Σ̅ / κυριος / kyrios (Lord), Υ̅Σ̅ / υιος / huios (Son), Σ̅Η̅Ρ̅ / σωτηρ / soter (saviour), Ο̅Υ̅Ν̅Ο̅Σ̅ / ουρανος / ouranos (heaven), Π̅Ν̅Α̅ / πνευμα / pneuma (Spirit), Π̅Η̅Ρ̅ / πατηρ / pater (Father), Μ̅Η̅Ρ̅ / μητηρ / meter (mother), Α̅Ν̅Ο̅Σ̅ / ανθρωπος / anthropos (Man), Σ̅Τ̅Ρ̅Σ̅ / σταυρος / stauros (cross), Δ̅Α̅Δ̅ / δαυιδ / Dauid (David), Ι̅Η̅Λ̅ / ισραηλ / Israel, Ι̅Λ̅Η̅Μ̅ / ιερουσαλημ / Ierousalem (Jerusalem). The words at the end of lines are sometimes abbreviated too. It uses typographic ligatures.

Current gaps in the manuscript

Matthew 1:1–9:1; 12:1–44; 13:55–14:9; 15:20–31; 20:18–21:5;
Mark 1:43–2:8; 2:23–3:5; 11:6–26; 14:54–15:5; 15:39–16:19;
Luke (at least 24 gaps according to Scrivener; current gaps based on the CSNTM text tags) 1:10-40; 2:14-3:1; 3:22-4:7; 5:13-29; 6:1-7:7; 7:27-36; 8:7-14, 33-50; 9:7-25, 31, 35-43; 9:55-10:12; 10:15-16, 18, 22-33; 11:23-12:5; 12:23; 12:28-13:13; 13:25-14:17; 14:29-15:4; 15:11-12; 15:15-16:2; 17:15-18:13; 18:29-40; 19:37-20:11; 20:22-21:27; 22:4-5, 9, 12, 16, 41; 22:43-23:10; 23:37-50; 24:4, 20-43.
John 3:5–14; 4:23–38; 5:18–38; 6:39–63; 7:28–8:10; 10:32–11:3; 12:14–25; 13:34-end.

Special features

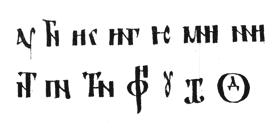
Ligatures used in the codex

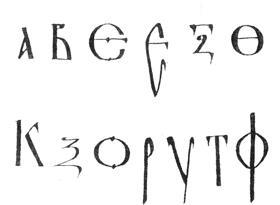
Small initial letters

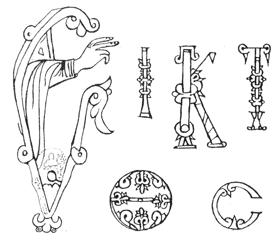
Large initial letters (decorated)

== Text ==
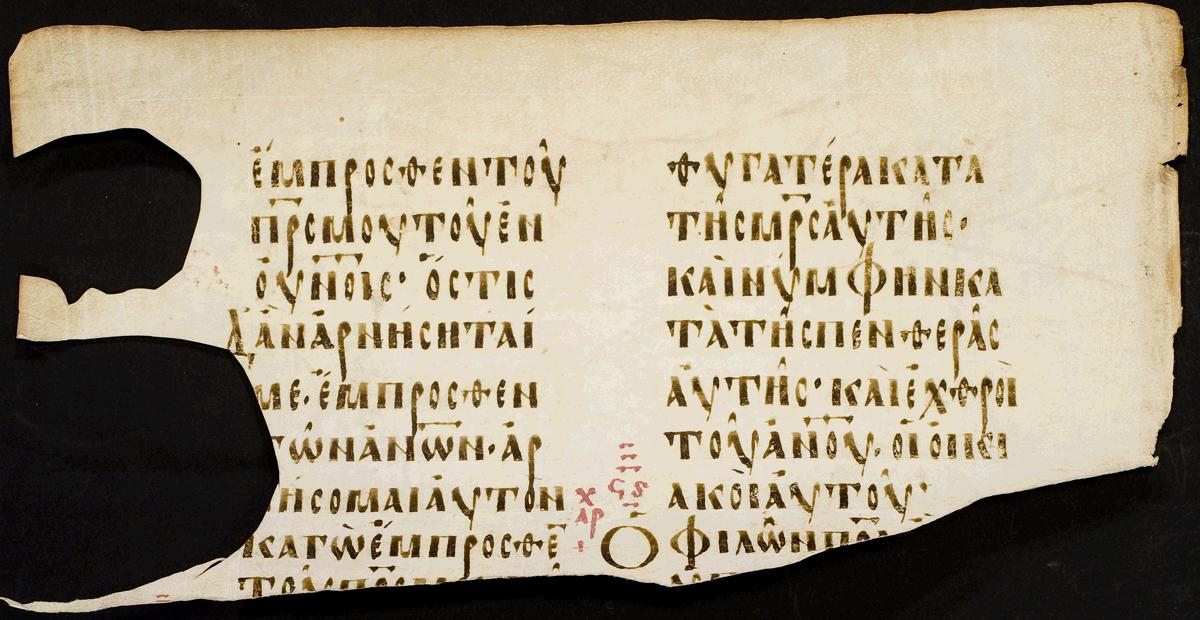
Folio 9 verso

The Greek text of this codex is considered a representative of the Byzantine text-type, but with a number of singular readings. According to biblical scholar Bruce M. Metzger, it is a typical Byzantine text. According to biblical scholars Kurt and Barbara Aland, it agrees with the Byzantine standard text 156 times, and 78 times with the Byzantine when it has the same reading as the "original" text. It does not support the "original" text against the Byzantine in any of the test passages. It has 11 independent or distinctive readings. Kurt Aland placed it in Category V of his New Testament manuscripts. Category V manuscripts are described as having "a purely or predominantly Byzantine text." It is not a very important codex, but it is an important witness of the Byzantine text-type. Hermann von Soden classified it as K^{i} (it is now classed as one of the manuscripts comprising textual Family E). According to the Claremont Profile Method (a specific analysis of textual data), it has mixed Byzantine text in Luke 1; in Luke 10 and Luke 20 the manuscript is defective.

=== Textual variants ===
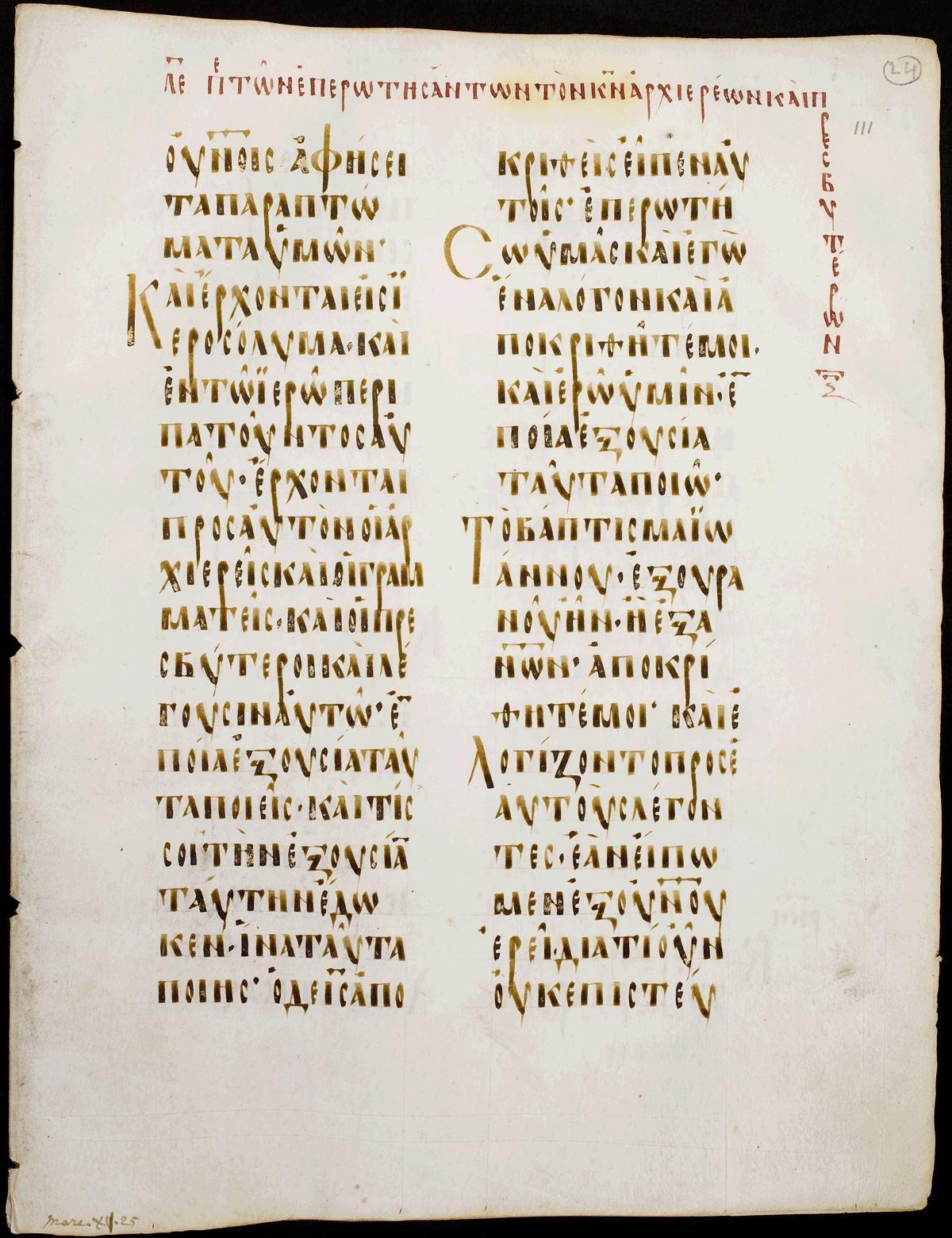
Folio 111 recto

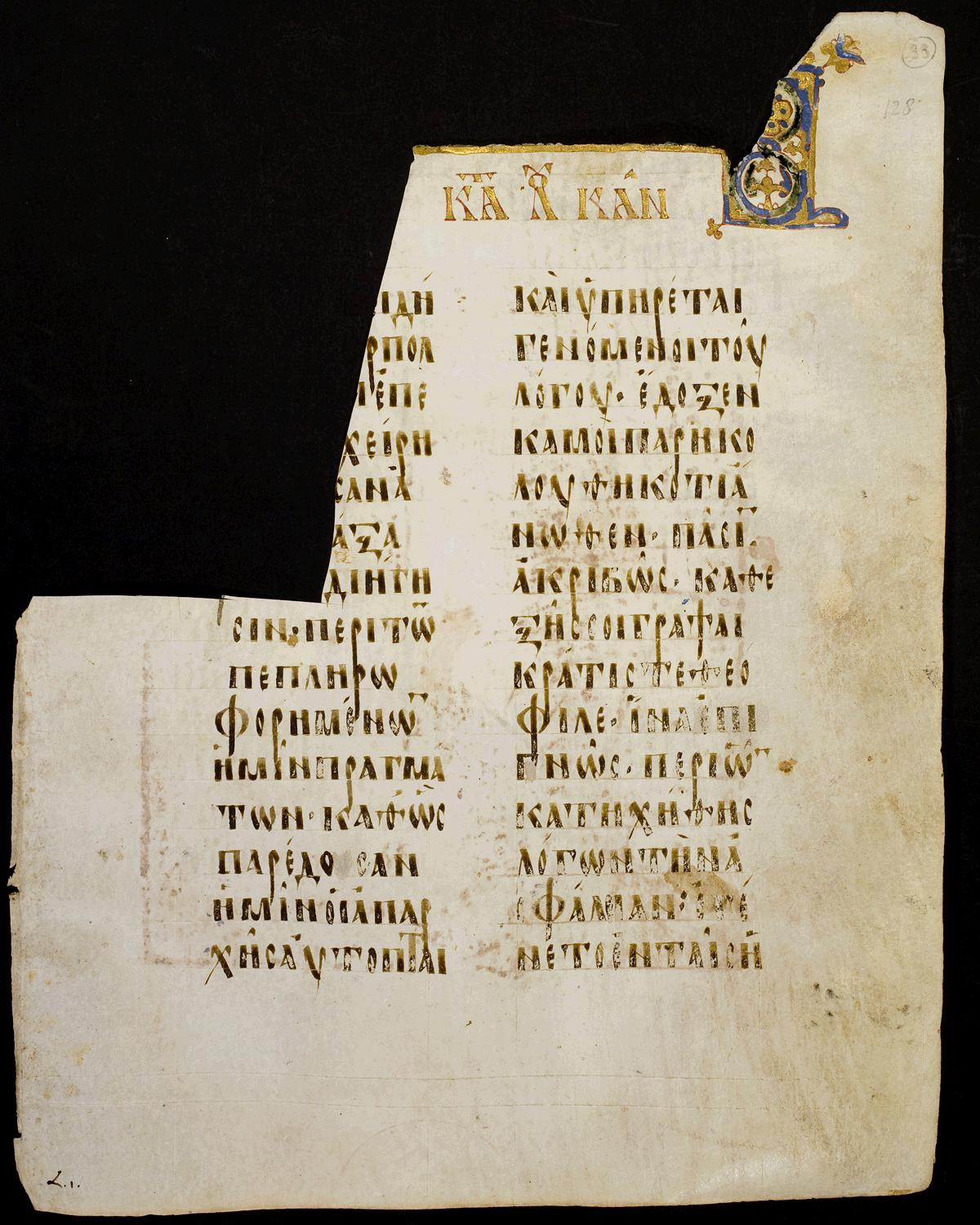
Folio 128 recto, the beginning of Luke

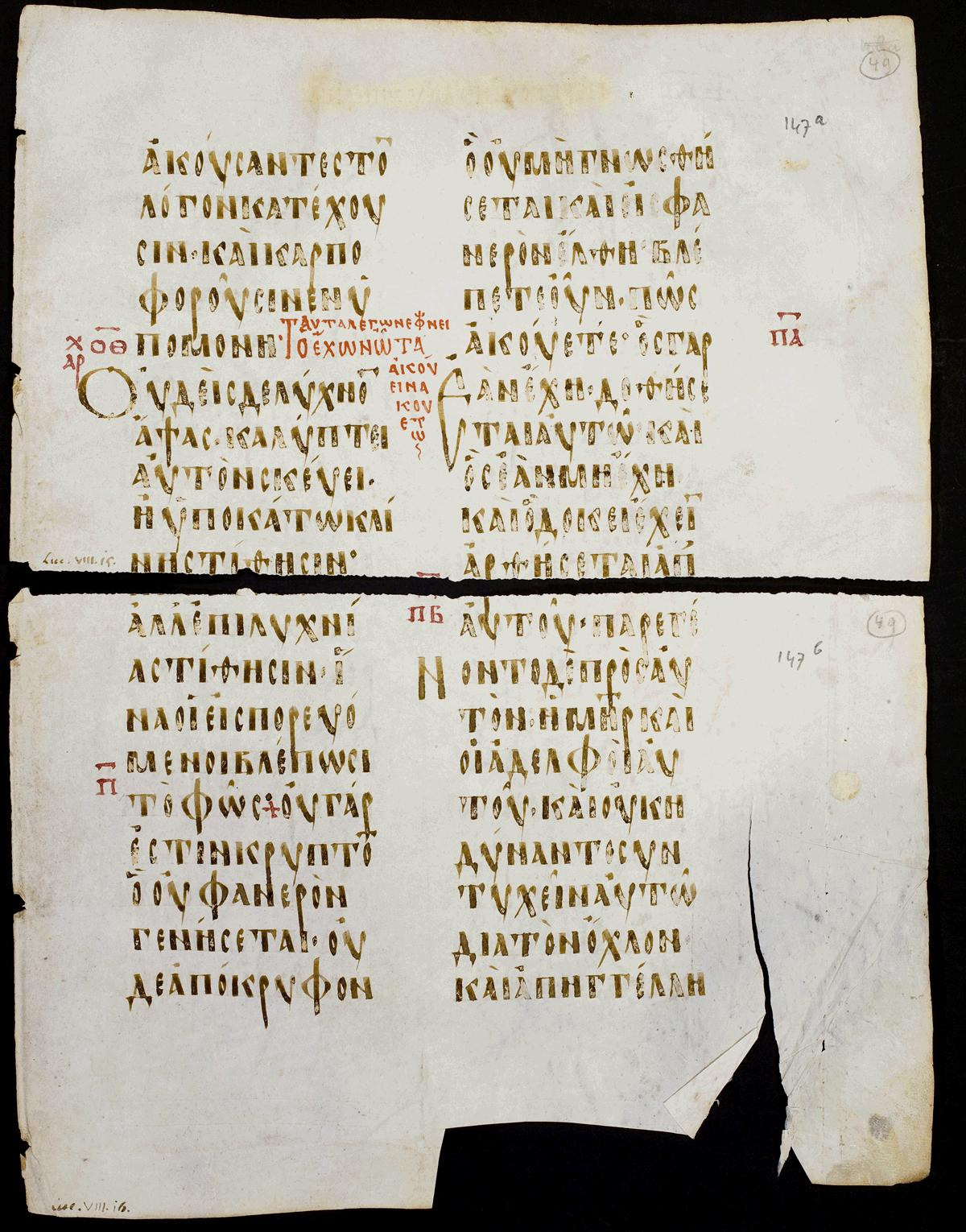
Folio 147r with text of Luke 6:15b-20a

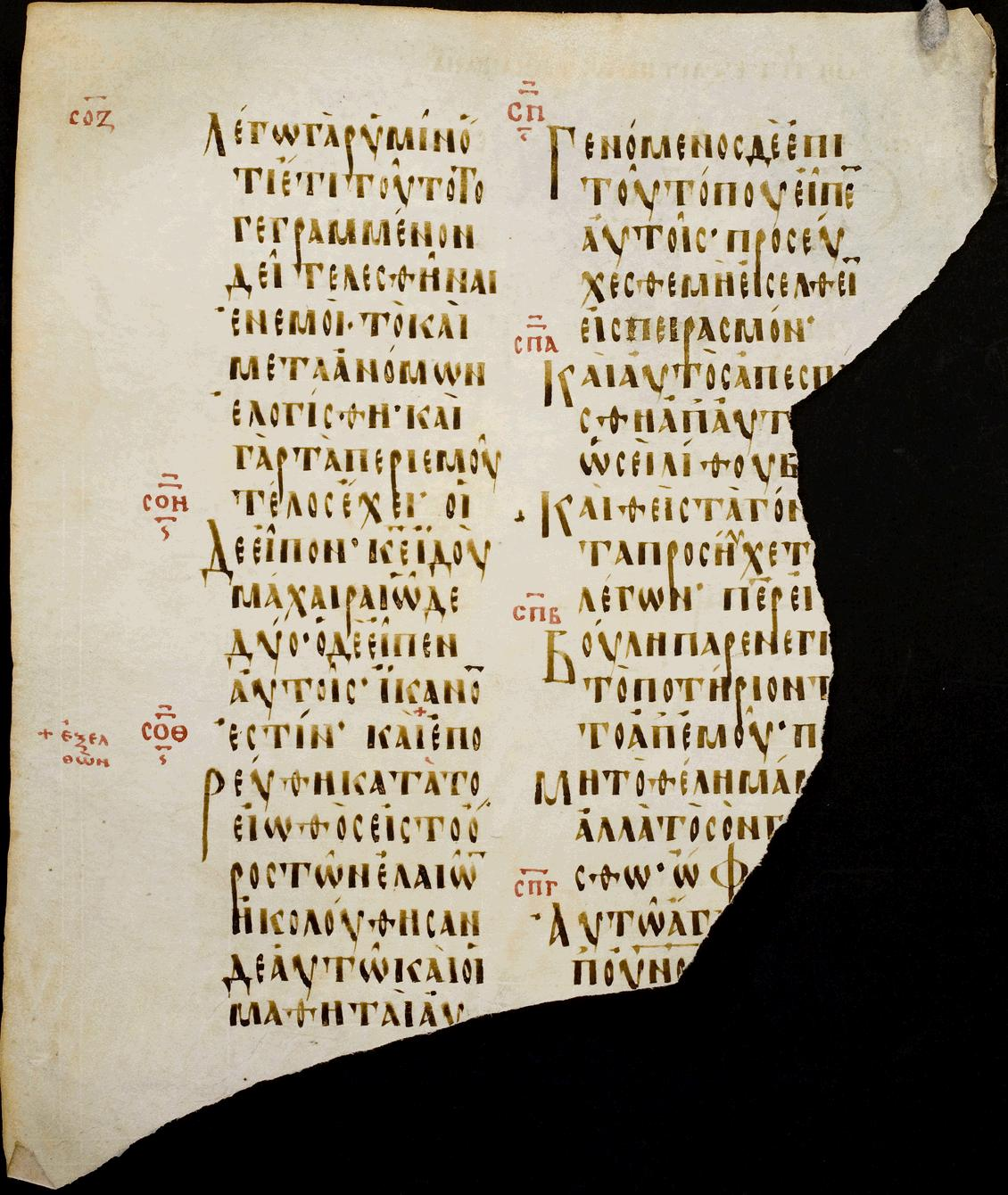
Folio 173 verso with text of Luke 22:37–43

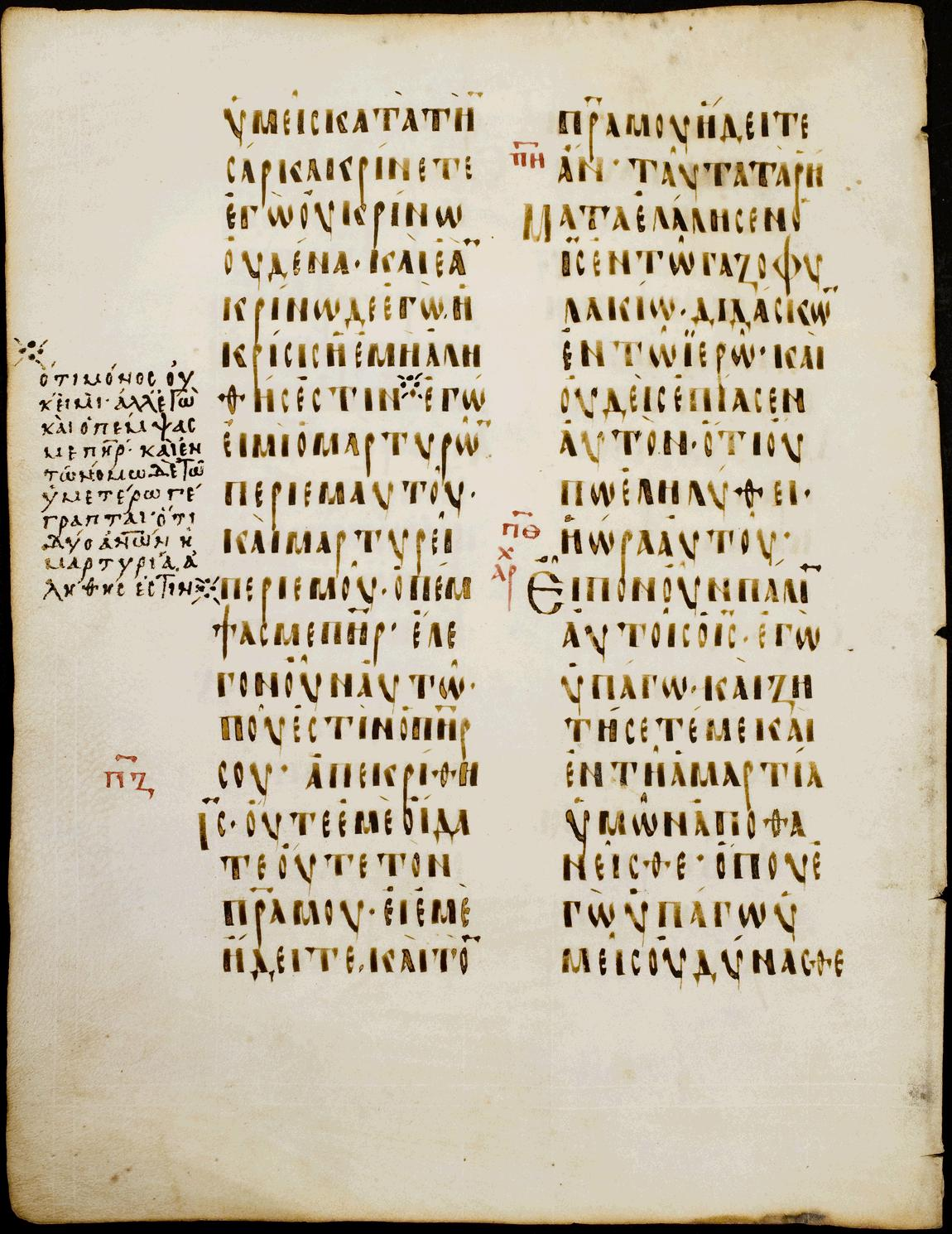
Folio 200 verso with text of John 8:15–21; John 8:16b-17 was omitted by scribe and added at the margin

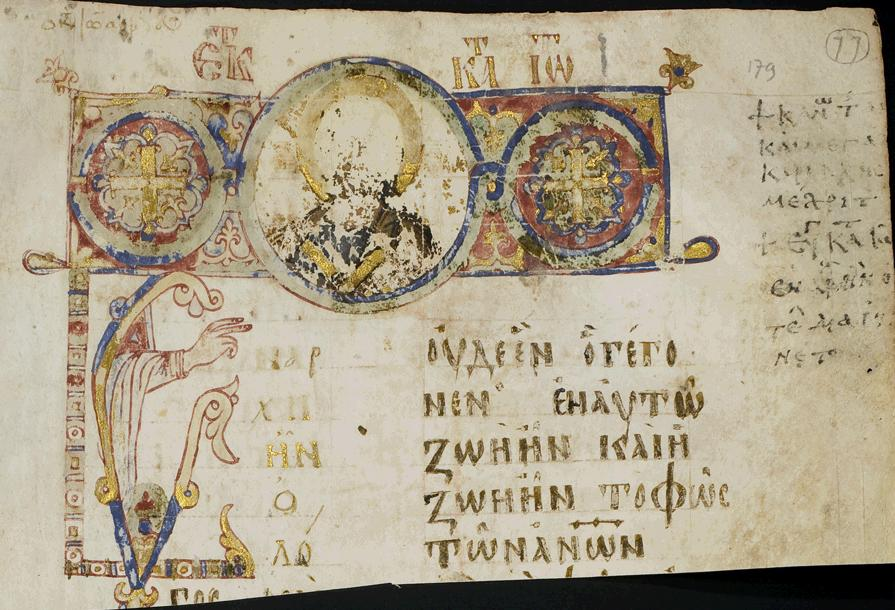
Folio 179 recto – the beginning of the Gospel of John

Biblical scholar Jodocus Heringa produced a collation of the readings of Codex Boreelianus against the Textus Receptus (the supposed received text used in Western Europe from the 17th century until the end of the 19th century), of which a sampling are below. Before the bracket are the Textus Receptus readings, afterwards those from Codex Boreelianus.

- Matthew 9:1: εμβας (embarked) ] εμβας ο Ιησους (Jesus embarked) (unique reading)
- Matthew 14:22: τους οχλους (the crowds) ] τον οχλον (the crowd) (later hand corrected to τους οχλους)
- Matthew 15:36: μαθηταις (disciples) ] ματαις (spelling error corrected by several later hands)
- Matthew 16:27: την πραξιν (the practices) ] τα εργα (the works)
- Matthew 16:28: των ωδε εστηκοτων (those stood here) ] ωδε εστωτες (stood here)
- Matthew 26:33: εγω ουδεποτε σκανδαλισθησομαι (I shall never be scandalised) ] εγω ουδεποτε σκανδαλισθησομαι εν σοι (I shall never be scandalised by you)
- Matthew 26:40: τω πετρω (to Peter) ] αυτοις (to them) (also read by F K M)
- Mark 7:3: κρατουντες την παραδοσιν των πρεσβυτερων (follow the traditions of the elders) ] κρατουντες των πρεσβυτερων (follow the elders)
- Mark 9:8: Ιησουν μονον μεθ' εαυτων (Jesus alone with them) ] Ιησουν μεθ' εαυτων (Jesus with them)
- Luke 8:22: αυτος ανεβη (He went up) ] αυτος ο Ιησους ανεβη (Jesus went up)
- Luke 8:30: επηρωτησε (asked) ] επερωτησε (spelling mistake for the augmentum')
- Luke 9:45: περι του ρηματος τουτου (concerning this statement) ] περι τουτου (concerning this)
- John 9:1: ειδεν (He saw) ] ο Ι(ησου)ς ειδεν (Jesus saw) (also read by G H)
- John 10:8: προ εμου (before Me) ] omit
- John 13:26: αποκρινεται ο Ιησους εκεινος εστιν (Jesus Answered, "This one is) ] omit

=== Against K^{r} ===
The words before the bracket are the readings of the K^{r} (traditional text used in Constantinople and still used by Eastern Orthodox Church), the words after are the readings of the codex.

John 5:44 ανθρωπων (men) ] αλληλων (others)
John 5:46 εμου γαρ (me, for) ] γαρ εμου (for me)
John 6:2 ηκολουθει (he followed) ] ηκολουθησεν (they followed)
John 6:5 αγορασομεν (we shall buy) ] αγορασωμεν (we may buy)
John 6:10 αναπεσον (lied down) ] αναπεσαν (spelling mistake)
John 10:8 ηλθον προ εμου (will come before me) ] ηλθον (will come)

== History ==
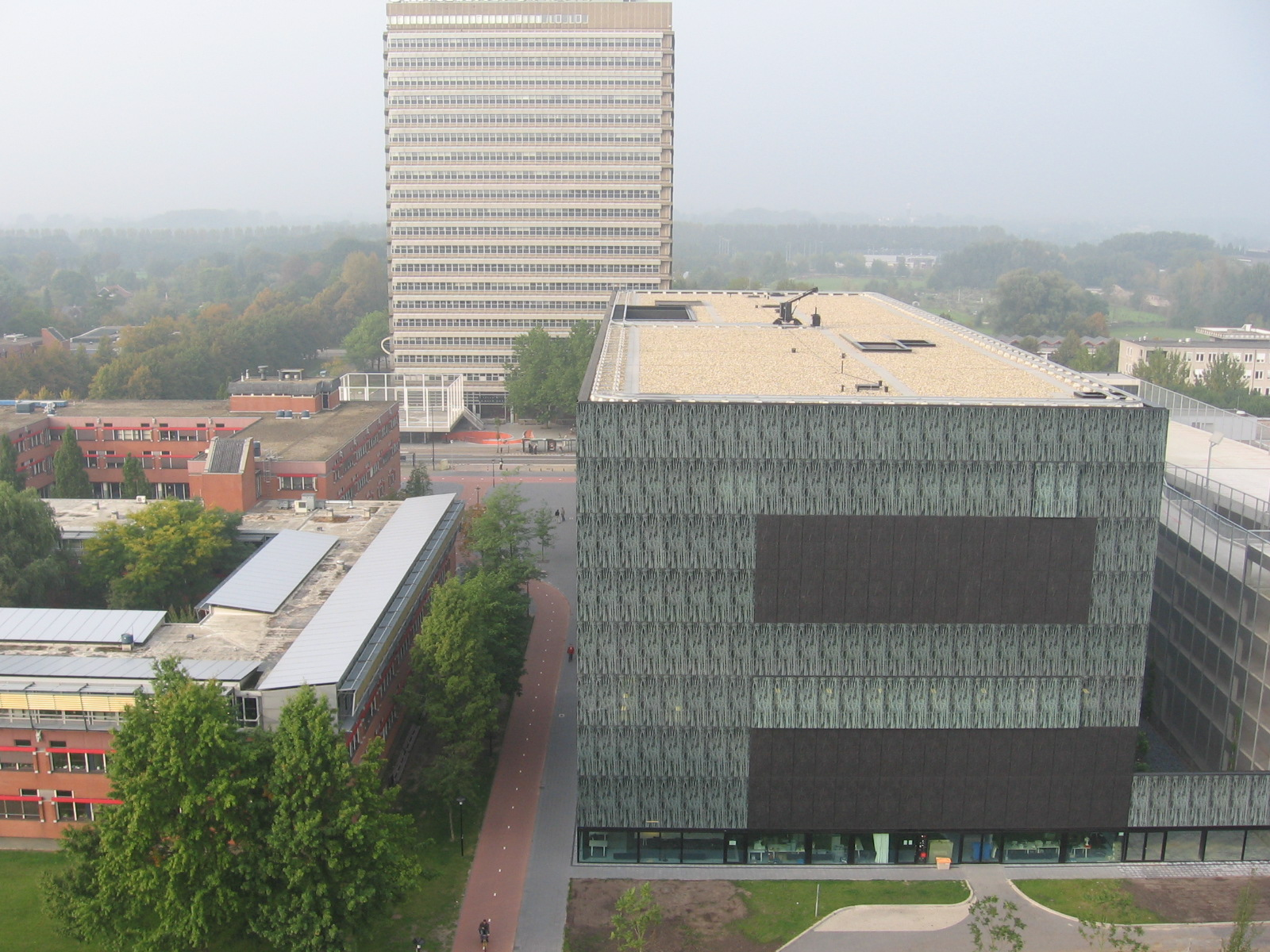
The codex is housed at the Utrecht University

The earliest history of the manuscript is unknown. The codex is named after Johann Boreel (1577–1629), Dutch Ambassador at the Court of James I of England. There is no record of when Boreel obtained the codex, but it is generally believed that he brought it to the Netherlands from one of his travels to the Middle East. The connection to Boreel is indicated by textual critic Johann Jakob Wettstein, who was given a partial collation of the codex in 1730. The collation was made by Izaak Verburg, rector of the Amsterdam gymnasium, and contained text from Matthew 7:2 to Luke 11. Wettstein adds that he was not aware of its current location. Wettstein cited the codex in his Novum Testamentum Graecum (1751), also in these parts, which do not survive to the present day (e.g. Matthew 7:9). Wettstein designated the codex by siglum F; textual critic Casper Rene Gregory designated it by F and 09; and textual critic Hermann von Soden gave it the siglum ε 86.

After Johann Boreel's death in 1629, the codex itself was in private hands. Boreel's library was sold in 1632, but the manuscript may not have been among the items for sale. It could have remained in the possession of Boreel's family, for example, in the hands of his younger brother, the theologian Adam Boreel (1602–54). On the front side (known as the recto) of folio 168 is written the monogram NLB with date "February 9, 1756". Dutch notes can found on the front and reverse (known as the verso) sides of page 40, but they are almost illegible. The codex resurfaced almost two centuries later, in 1823, and was identified as the Boreelianus by the Utrecht professor Jodocus Heringa (1765–1840). Its leaves had become disordered, and some of them were lost. Scrivener even stated: "Few manuscripts have fallen into such unworthy hands". The manuscript was now in the private hands of Johannes Michaelis Roukens in Arnhem. In a letter of 11 March 1830, Roukens explained that the manuscript had been in the possession of his father, Arend Anton Roukens, who had inherited it from his father, Johannes Michaelis Roukens.

In 1841 biblical scholar Constantin von Tischendorf wanted to see and examine the codex, but he was only allowed to read Heringa's papers on it, as himself Heringa was preparing a collation for publication. Heringa's papers were edited and published by Vinke in 1843 under the title Jodoci Heringa El. Fil: Disputatio de codice Boreeliano, nunc Rheno-Trajectino ab ipso in lucem protracto, which includes a "full and exact" collation of the text. Though initially having some difficulty gaining permission, textual critic Samuel Prideaux Tregelles examined the codex in 1850.

Biblical scholar Philipp Schaff in the Introduction to the American Edition of Westcott and Hort's The New Testament in the Original Greek (1881) wrote that it is "not an important manuscript." The same opinion was given by biblical scholar Frederic G. Kenyon, according to whom the text of the codex has "comparatively little authority". Despite these opinions, the codex continues to be cited in critical editions of Novum Testamentum Graece. The editions of Nestle-Aland cite the codex from its first verse – i.e. Matthew 9:1 – in its critical apparatus.

In 1876, paleographer H. Deane dated the manuscript to the 8th century, though Tischendorf and Gregory dated it to the 9th century; Doedes and Tregelles dated it later to the 10th century. As of 1995, it is dated by the Institute for New Testament Textual Research (INTF) to the 9th century.

The codex has been located in the library of the Utrecht University (shelf number Ms. 1) since 1830. In March 2007, scholar David Trobisch visited Utrecht and viewed the manuscript with a number of colleagues. In October 2007 the manuscript was digitized.

== See also ==
- Codex Basilensis (E)
- Codex Seidelianus I (G)
- List of New Testament uncials
- Textual criticism
- Biblical commentary
