= Codex Basilensis A. N. III. 12 =

Uncial 07
- New Testament manuscript
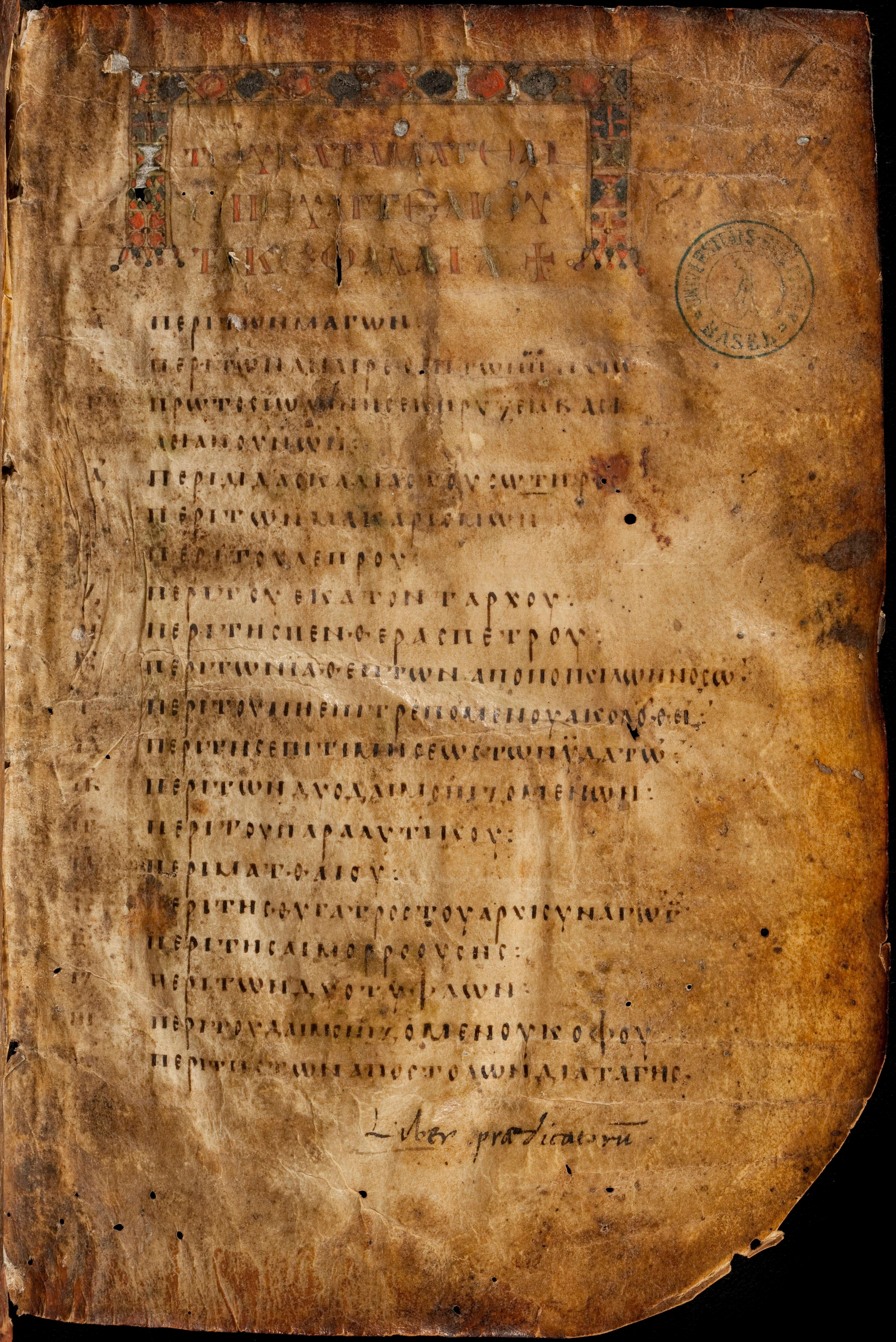
- Table of contents to the Gospel of Matthew
- Name: Codex Basilensis
- Sign: E^{e}
- Text: Gospels
- Date: 8th century
- Script: Greek
- Found: 1431
- Now at: Basel University Library
- Size: 23 × 16.5 cm (9.1 × 6.5 in)
- Type: Byzantine text-type
- Category: V
- Hand: carefully written
- Note: member of Family E

Codex Basilensis is a Greek uncial manuscript of the four Gospels written on parchment. It is designated by E^{e} or 07 in the Gregory-Aland numbering of New Testament manuscripts, and ε55 in the von Soden numbering of New Testament manuscripts. Using the study of comparative writing styles (palaeography), it has been dated to the 8th century.

The manuscript contains marginal notes, was adapted for liturgical reading, and contains some missing portions. Three leaves of the codex were overwritten by a later hand; these leaves are considered palimpsests. Though it was available for biblical scholar Desiderius Erasmus for his edition of the first published printed Greek New Testament, he never consulted it.

== Description ==
The manuscript is a codex (precursor to the modern book) containing an almost complete text of the four Gospels on 318 parchment leaves (sized 23 × 16.5 centimetres (9.1 × 6.5 in)). The text is written in one column per page, with 23 or more lines per page in uncial letters. The Gospel of Luke contains five small gaps (1:69-2:4, 3:4-15, 12:58-13:12, 15:8-20, 24:47-end). Three of them were later completed in cursive (1:69-2:4, 12:58-13:12, 15:8-20).

It has a regular system of punctuation. The handwriting style is similar to that in Codex Alexandrinus, though not so regular and neat. The initial letters are decorated with green, blue, and vermilion ink.

It contains tables of contents (known as κεφαλαια / kephalaia) before each Gospel, and the text is divided according to the chapters (also known as κεφαλαια), the numbers of which are placed in the margin. The chapters are divided into the Ammonian Sections, with references to the Eusebian Canons written below the Ammonian Section numbers (both early systems of dividing the gospels into referential sections), along with harmonising references to other Gospels at the foot of the pages, although full references to all parallel texts are given in the margins and the tables are thus superfluous. The initial letters at the beginning sections stand out in the margin (known as εκθεσις / ekthesis) as also seen in codices Alexandrinus and Ephraemi Rescriptus. The page margins also contain the names of Feast days and their lecton references, together with other liturgical notes.

Certain disputed passages are marked with an asterisk – signs of the times (Matthew 16:2b-3), Christ's agony (Luke 22:43-44), Luke 23:34 (And Jesus said, "Father forgive them, for the know not what they do"), and the Pericope Adulterae (John 8:2-11).

The codex was bound with the 12th century minuscule codex 2087, which contains portions of the Book of Revelation. Three leaves of the codex are palimpsests (folios 160, 207, and 214) – they were overwritten by a later hand. Folio 207 contains a fragment of Ephraem Syrus in Greek, while the texts of folios 160 and 214 are still unidentified.

== Text ==
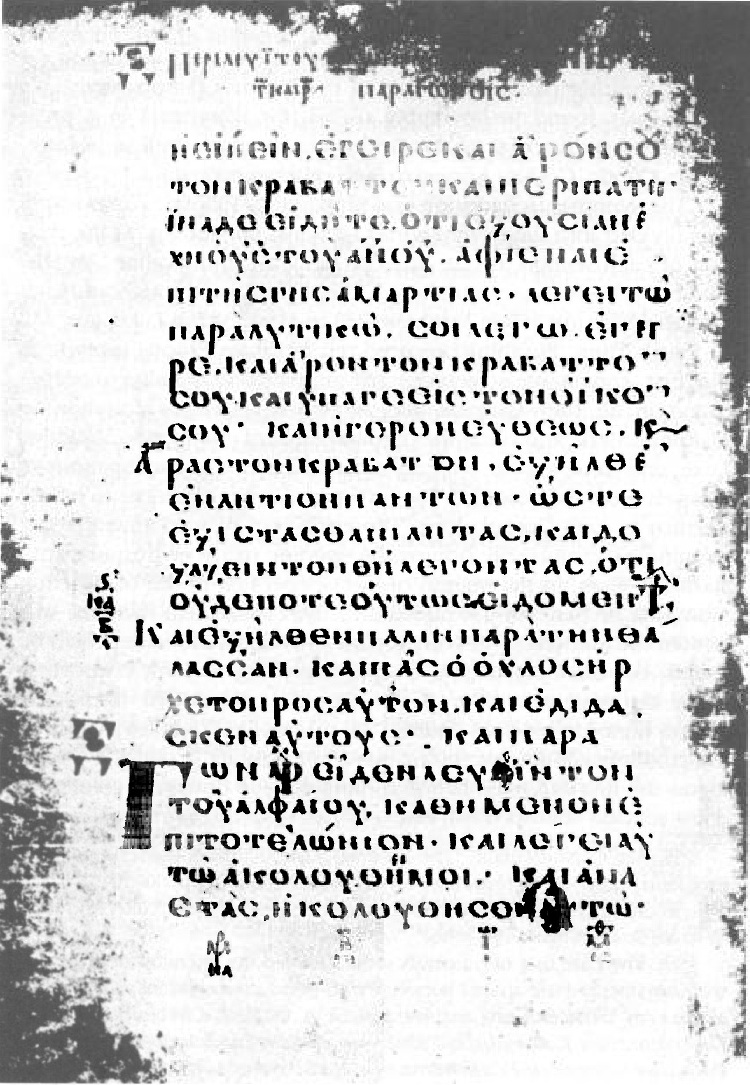
Mark 2:9-14

The Greek text of this codex is considered a representative of the Byzantine text-type, but with a small number of non-Byzantine readings. The text-types are groups of different New Testament manuscripts which share specific or generally related readings, which then differ from each other group, and thus the conflicting readings can separate out the groups. These are then used to determine the original text as published; there are three main groups with names: Alexandrian, Western, and Byzantine. The text of the manuscript has been cited in all critical editions of the Greek New Testament, but it is not highly esteemed by scholars. According to textual critics Kurt and Barbara Aland, out of 316 readings tested, it agrees with the Byzantine text-type 209 times against what the Alands consider to be the original text, and 107 times with both the Byzantine and what the Alands consider to be the original text. Only one reading agrees with what the Alands consider to be the original text against the Byzantine. There are 9 independent or distinctive readings. Aland placed its text in Category V of his New Testament classification system. Category V manuscripts are for "Manuscripts with a purely or predominantly Byzantine text."

It belongs to the textual Family E (the early Byzantine text) and is closely related to Codex Nanianus (U 030), and Codex Athous Dionysiou (Ω 045). It is probably the oldest manuscript with a pure Byzantine text (with almost a complete text of the Gospels), and it is one of the most important witnesses of the Byzantine text-type.

Some textual variants

Matthew 8:13

και υποστρεψας ο εκατονταρχος εις τον οικον αυτου εν αυτη τη ωρα ευρεν τον παιδα υγιαινοντα (and when the centurion returned to the house in that hour, he found the slave well)

incl. - E^{ast} א C M N U Θ Uncial 0250 ƒ^{1} 33 1241 g^{1} syr^{h}
omit - Majority of manuscripts.

Mark 5:9

απεκριθη λεγων (he answered, saying) - E 565 700 pm
λεγει αυτω (said to him) - Majority of manuscripts.

John 1:22

συ τις ει (Who are you?) - E 𝔓^{66}^{c} 𝔓^{75} 157
τις ει (Who are (you)?) - Majority of manuscripts.

John 1:28

βηθανια (Bethania) - E 𝔓^{66} 𝔓^{75} א B W^{s}
βηθαραβα (Bethabara) - Majority of manuscripts.

John 4:1

ο Κυριος (the Lord) - E 𝔓^{66}^{c} 𝔓^{75} Majority of manuscripts
ο Ιησουυς (Jesus) - 𝔓^{66}* א D Θ 086 ƒ^{1} 565 1241 lat sy^{c, p, h} bo.

John 5:44

αλληλων (one another) - E Δ
ανθρωπων (men) - Majority of manuscripts.

John 8:9

οι δε ακουσαντες και υπο της συνειδησεως ελεγχομενοι εξερχοντο εις καθ εις (But they heard this, and having been overtaken my remorse, they went away, one by one) - E G H K S pm
οι δε ακουσαντες εξερχοντο εις καθ εις (But after hearing this, they went away, one by one) - Majority of manuscripts.

John 10:8

ηλθων (came) - E 𝔓^{45}^{(vid)} 𝔓^{75} א^{*, c2b} Γ Δ 892^{s}s 1424 pm
ηλθων προ εμου (came before me) - Majority of manuscripts.

== History ==
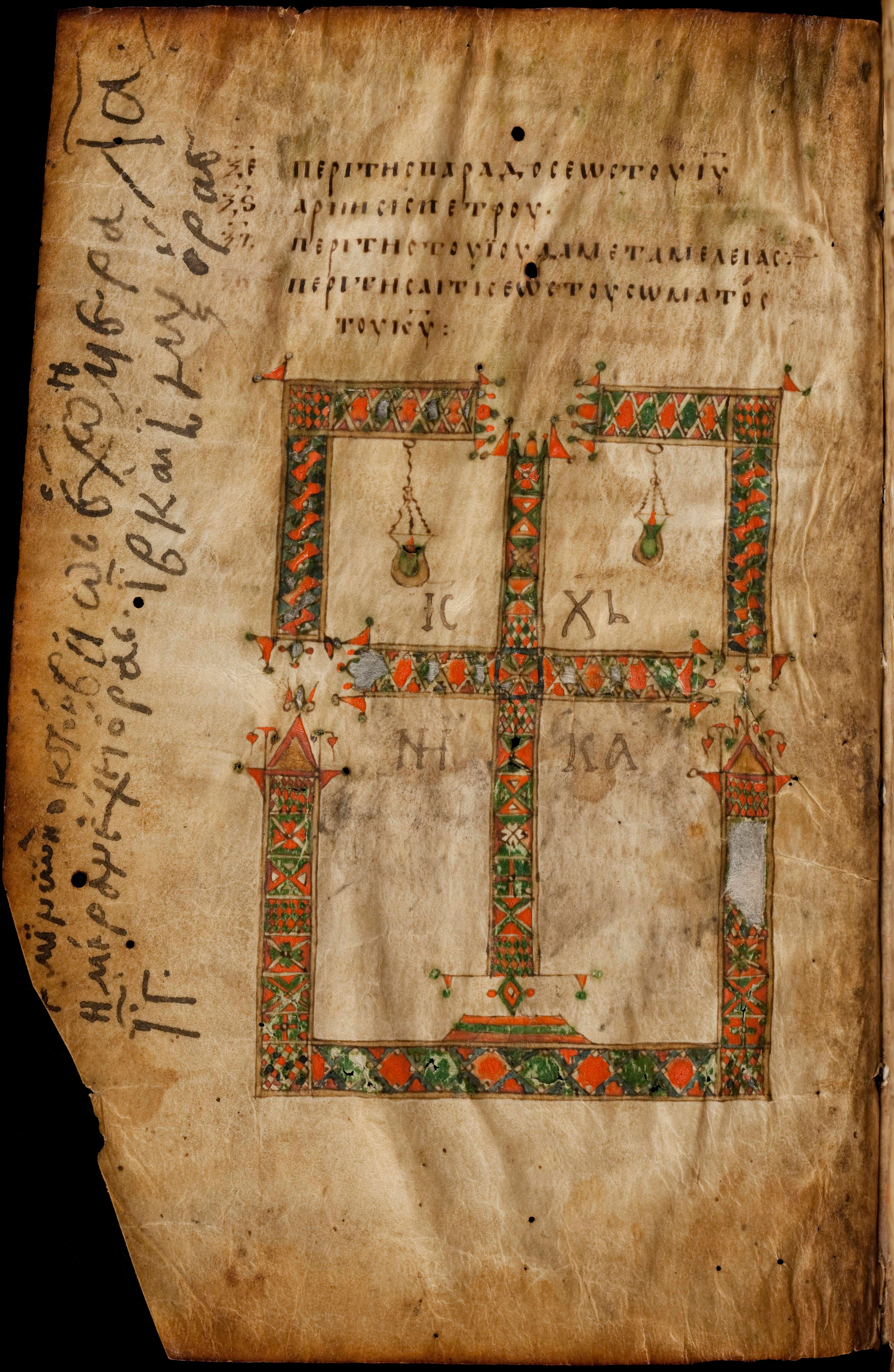
The cross on the eighth page

Use in the Greek New Testament editions

The codex was available to Erasmus for his edition of the New Testament in Basel, but he never used it. The text of the manuscript was collated by textual critic Johann Jakob Wettstein, and the manuscript was used by John Mill in his edition of the Greek New Testament. It has been cited in printed editions of the Greek New Testament since the 18th century.

The manuscript is cited in nearly all critical editions of the Greek New Testament (UBS3, UBS4, NA26,). It is never cited in NA27, due to it not being considered a "consistently cited witness of the first order " or "consistently cited witness of the second order".

Dating

It is dated by most scholars to the 8th century (Scrivener, Gregory, Nestle, Aland, Metzger). Dean Burgon proposed the 7th century due to the shape of the letters, but the names of Feasts days with their proper lessons and other liturgical markings have been inserted by a later hand. Scrivener dated it to the middle of the 8th century, stating that from the shape of most of the letters (e.g. pi, delta, xi), it might be judged of even earlier date. According to papyrologist Guglielmo Cavallo it was written in the early 8th century.

Cataldi Palau suggests it was written at a later date in the 9th century, arguing from the palaeographical point of view it looks older, but the regularity of the accentuation and the abundant colourful decoration are uncharacteristic of the 8th century. The number of errors is remarkably small. According to Palau it was copied by a non-Greek, probably Latin scribe, in 9th century Italy. The Italian location had a strong Byzantine influence.

Location

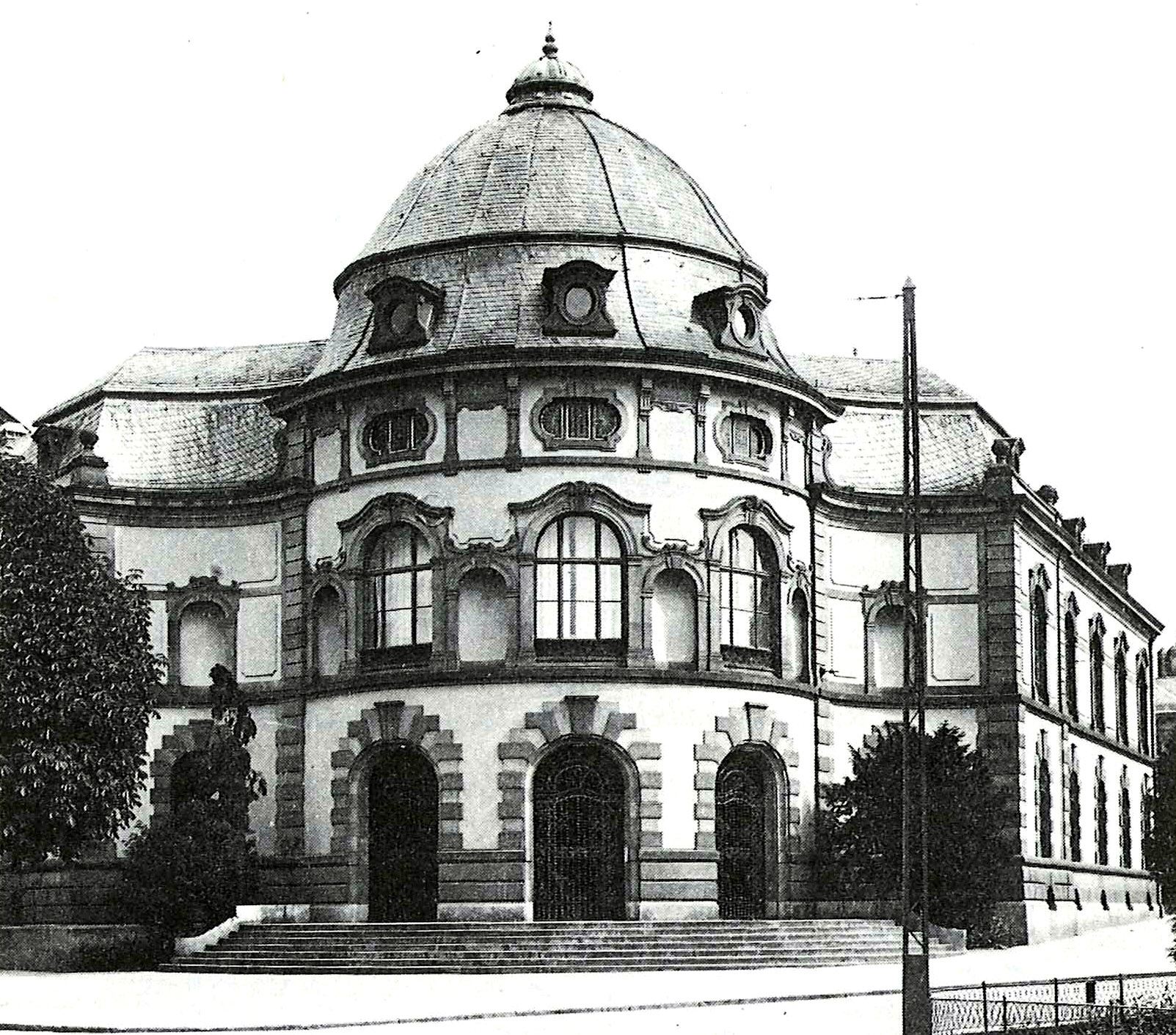
Basel University Library in 1896

It was probably brought to Basel by Cardinal Ragusio (1380–1443), who may have acquired it in Constantinople when he attended the Council of Florence in 1431. In 1559 it was presented to the monastery of the Preaching Friars. In the same year it was transferred to Basel University Library (shelf number A. N. III. 12), in Basel (Switzerland), where it is currently housed. It formerly had the shelf-number B VI. 21, but is now K IV. 35.

== See also ==
- List of New Testament uncials
- Family E
- Biblical manuscript
- Textual criticism
