= Cataldi =

Cataldi is an Italian surname. Notable people with the surname include:

- Angelo Cataldi (born 1951), American radio personality
- Anna Cataldi (1939–2021), Italian humanitarian and journalist
- Annaclara Cataldi Palau, Italian paleographer
- Danilo Cataldi (born 1994), Italian footballer
- Lee Cataldi (born 1942), Australian poet
- Marianna Cataldi (born 1976), Italian singer-songwriter and composer
- Pietro Cataldi (1548–1626), Italian mathematician
- Renato Cataldi (1909–1981), Brazilian painter
