= Minuscule 422 =

- New Testament manuscript
- Text: Gospels
- Date: 11th century
- Script: Greek
- Now at: Bavarian State Library
- Size: 23.8 cm by 16.8 cm
- Type: Byzantine text-type
- Category: V
- Note: full marginalia

Minuscule 422 (in the Gregory-Aland numbering), ε 186 (in the Soden numbering), is a Greek minuscule manuscript of the New Testament, on parchment. Palaeographically it has been assigned to the 11th century. The marginal equipment is full.

== Description ==
The codex contains a complete text of the four Gospels on 256 parchment leaves (23.8 cm by 16.8 cm). It is written in two columns per page, in 28 lines per page. The manuscript was written by an ignorant scribe, who made many errors.

The text is divided according to the κεφαλαια (chapters), whose numbers are given at the margin, and their τιτλοι (titles) at the top of the pages. There is also a division according to the smaller Ammonian Sections (in Mark 240 Sections, the last in 16:19), with references to the Eusebian Canons (partially).

It contains the Epistula ad Carpianum, Prolegomena, tables of the κεφαλαια (tables of contents) before each Gospel, Synaxarion, Menologion, subscriptions at the end of each Gospel, and numbers στιχοι. Lectionary markings at the margin were added by a later hand.

== Text ==
The Greek text of the codex is a representative of the Byzantine text-type. Aland placed it in Category V. According to the Claremont Profile Method it represents textual family K^{x} in Luke 10 and Luke 20. In Luke 1 it has a mixture of the Byzantine text-families.

== History ==
The manuscript was added to the list of New Testament manuscripts by Scholz (1794–1852). It was examined by Dean Burgon in 1873. C. R. Gregory saw it in 1887.

The manuscript is currently housed at the Bavarian State Library (Gr. 210) in Munich.

== See also ==
- List of New Testament minuscules
- Biblical manuscript
- Textual criticism
