= Codex Seidelianus II =

Greek manuscript of the Gospels

Uncial 013
- New Testament manuscript
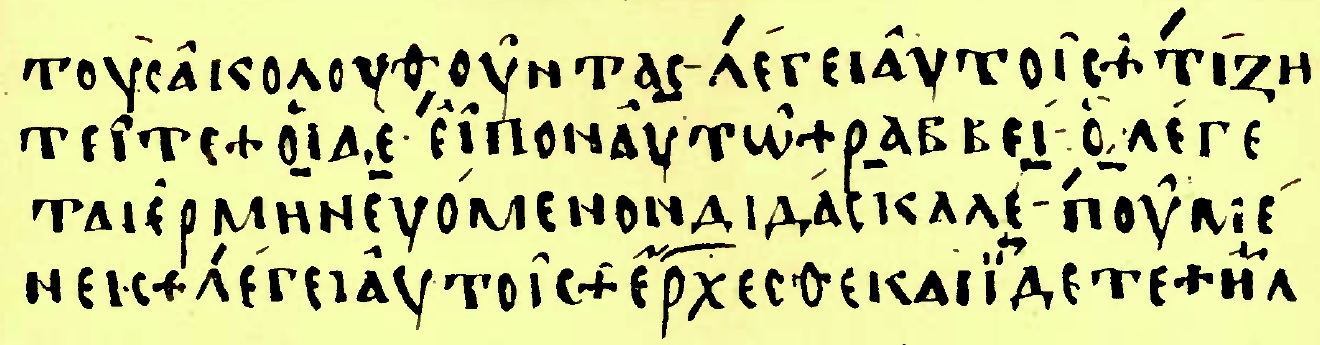
- Scrivenr's facsimile
- Name: Seidelianus II
- Sign: H^{e}
- Text: Gospels
- Date: 9th century
- Script: Greek
- Found: Seidel
- Now at: University of Hamburg, and Trinity College, Cambridge
- Size: 22 cm by 18 cm
- Type: Byzantine text-type
- Category: V

Codex Seidelianus II designated by H^{e} or 013 (in the Gregory-Aland numbering), ε 88 (von Soden), is a Greek uncial manuscript of the four Gospels, dated palaeographically to the 9th century. The manuscript is lacunose.

== Description ==
The codex contains 194 parchment leaves (22 cm by 18 cm). The text is written in one column per page, and 23 lines per column. The codex contains the text of the four Gospels with major lacunae (Matt. 1:1-15:30, 25:33-26:3, Mark 1:32-2:4, 15:44-16:14, Luke 5:18-32, 6:8-22, 10:2-19, John 9:30-10:25, 18:2-18, 20:12-25).

The codex contains lists of the κεφαλαια (lists of contents), numbers of the κεφαλαια (chapters) at the margin, the τιτλοι (titles) at the top, the Ammonian Sections but not the Eusebian Canons. It has breathings and accents.

== Text ==
The Greek text of this codex is a representative of the Byzantine text-type. Aland gave to it textual profile 174^{1} 82^{1/2} 2^{2} 7^{s} and placed it in Category V. It belongs to the textual family E, but according to the Claremont Profile Method in Gospel of LUke it represents the textual family K^{x}.

== History ==
The codex was brought from the East by Erasmus Seidel at the beginning of the 17th century, together with Codex Seidelianus I. Maturin Veyssière de La Croze bought it 1718, in the same time as Seidelianus I.

Since 1838 the codex is located in Hamburg Universitätsbibliothek (Cod. 91). One leaf of the codex is housed at Trinity College, Cambridge (B XVII 20.21).

It was examined by Petersen, Bentley, Tregelles, Tischendorf, and Gregory.

== See also ==
- List of New Testament uncials
- Textual criticism
