= Minuscule 98 =

- New Testament manuscript
- Text: Gospels
- Date: 11th century
- Script: Greek
- Found: E. D. Clarke
- Now at: Bodleian Library
- Size: 21.5 cm by 16 cm
- Type: Byzantine text-type
- Category: V
- Note: marginalia

Minuscule 98 (in the Gregory-Aland numbering), ε 266 (von Soden), is a Greek minuscule manuscript of the New Testament, on parchment leaves. Palaeographically it has been assigned to the 11th century. It has marginalia, it was adapted for liturgical use.

== Description ==
The codex contains a complete text of the four Gospels on 222 leaves (size 21.5 cm by 16 cm). The text is written stichometrically in one column per page, 25 lines per page. The initial letters in red. There are Iota adscriptum.

The text is divided according to the κεφαλαια (chapters), whose numbers are given at the margin, and the τιτλοι (titles of chapters) at the top of the pages. There is also a division according to the Ammonian Sections (no references to the Eusebian Canons).

It contains pictures of Evangelists, lists of the κεφαλαια (tables of contents) before each Gospel, lectionary markings at the margin (for liturgical use), subscriptions at the end of each Gospel, and numbers of στιχοι.

== Text ==
The Greek text of the codex is a representative of the Byzantine text-type. Aland placed it in Category V. According to the Claremont Profile Method it belongs to the textual family K^{x} in Luke 1 and Luke 10. In Luke 20 it has mixed Byzantine text with some relationship to the M groups.

== History ==
The manuscript was brought by Edward Daniel Clarke (1769-1822) from the East to England. It was by one librarian collated in Matthew 6; 9; 10; Mark 5; 6; Luke 4; 5; 6 for Scholz. Wettstein's 98 is Lectionary 294. C. R. Gregory saw it in 1883.

It is currently housed at the Bodleian Library (E. D. Clarke 5), at Oxford.

== See also ==
- List of New Testament minuscules
- Biblical manuscript
- Textual criticism
