= Codex Mosquensis II =

Uncial 031
- New Testament manuscript
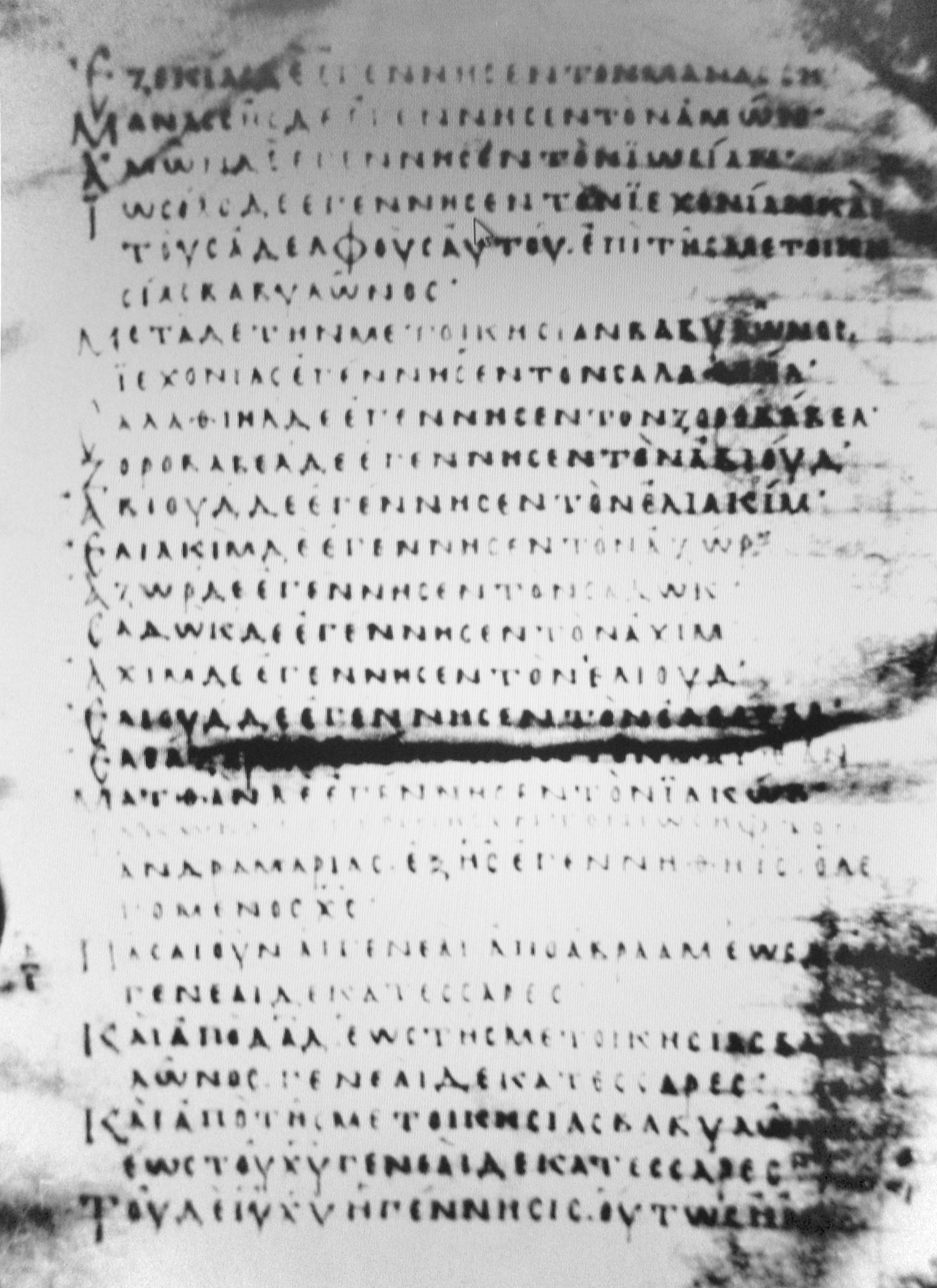
- Matthew 1:1-18
- Name: Mosquensis II
- Sign: V
- Text: Gospels †
- Date: 9th-century
- Script: Greek
- Found: Athos
- Now at: State Historical Museum
- Size: 15.7 cm by 11.5 cm
- Type: Byzantine text-type
- Category: V
- Hand: diligent

Codex Mosquensis II is a Greek uncial manuscript of the New Testament Gospels. It is designated by V or 031 in the Gregory-Aland numbering of New Testament manuscripts, and ε75 in the von Soden numbering of New Testament manuscripts. Using the study of comparative writings styles (palaeography), it is dated to the 9th century. The manuscript has several gaps.

== Description ==
The manuscript is a codex (precursor to the modern book format) containing the text of the four Gospels written on 220 parchment leaves (15.7 cm by 11.5 cm). It has some gaps (missing Matthew 5:44-6:12, 9:18-10:1, 22:44-23:35, John 21:10 to the end). The leaves are arranged in octavo format (this being the gathering of 8 parchment leaves, and then folded in half to make a block). The text of the manuscript is written in one column per page, 28 lines per page, in small and fine uncial letters. It contains pitch accents, but punctuation is rare. The codex is written in uncial letters up to John 8:39, where it breaks off, and from that point the text is continued in a minuscule hand from the 13th century on 10 parchment leaves.

It contains the Epistle to Carpius (a letter outlying the chapter divisions of the Gospels as devised by the early church father, Eusebius of Caesarea), and the Eusebian tables. The tables of contents (known as κεφαλαια / kephalaia) are placed before the Gospels, but there are no divisions of the text according to the chapters (also known as κεφαλαια). The text is divided only according to the Ammonian Sections (an early division of the Gospels into sections) which are written in the margins, with references to the Eusebian Canons (another early division of the Gospels into sections, based on the Ammonian). The text has lectionary markings, and according to scholar Christian Frederick Matthaei it is written in a kind of stichometry (sense-lines) by a diligent scribe.

The manuscript contains a portion from the Chronology of Hippolitus from Theben. It also contains the Synaxarion (a list of Saint's days and their corresponding feasts). The minuscule text was designated by textual critic Johann J. Griesbach as 87, and by textual critic Johann M. A. Scholz as 250.

Manuscript Contents

- Matthew 1:1-5:43, 6:13-9:17, 10:2-22:33, 23:36-28:20
- Mark 1:1-16:20
- Luke 1:1-24:53
- John 1:1-21:9 (replacement minuscule text from John 8:39 onwards).

== Text ==
The Greek text is considered a representative of the Byzantine text-type. Biblical scholar Kurt Aland placed it in Category V of his New Testament manuscript classification system. Category V is for "Manuscripts with a purely or predominantly Byzantine text." According to the Claremont Profile Method (a specific analysis method of textual data), it is a member of the textual Family E. It has some textual resemblance to Codex Campianus (M). It lacks the text of Matthew 16:2b–3 (the Signs of the Times).

== History and present Location ==
The manuscript was previously held in the Vatopedi monastery an Mount Athos, Greece. In 1655 it was brought by the monk Arsenius to Moscow, on the suggestion of the Patriarch Nikon, in the reign of Alexei Mikhailovich Romanov (1645–1676).

It was collated by Matthaei in 1779 and in 1783. In 1783 the manuscript was only missing the texts of Matthew 22:44-23:35, and John 21:10 to the end, with the now missing portions somehow being lost afterwards. According to biblical scholar Frederick H. A. Scrivener, it was one of the best manuscripts collated by Matthaei.

Textual critic Constantin von Tischendorf used the collation done by Matthaei in his Novum Testamentum. Biblical scholar Caspar René Gregory saw the manuscript in 1868. The manuscript was examined by classical philologist Kurt Treu. In 1908, Gregory assigned it the siglum V/031. The codex is now located in the State Historical Museum (V. 9).

== See also ==
- Codex Washingtonianus (W / 032)
- Codex Nanianus (U / 030)
- List of New Testament uncials
- Textual criticism
- Biblical manuscript
