= Cataldo Ambulance Service =

Private ambulance company in Greater Boston

Cataldo Ambulance Service, Inc.

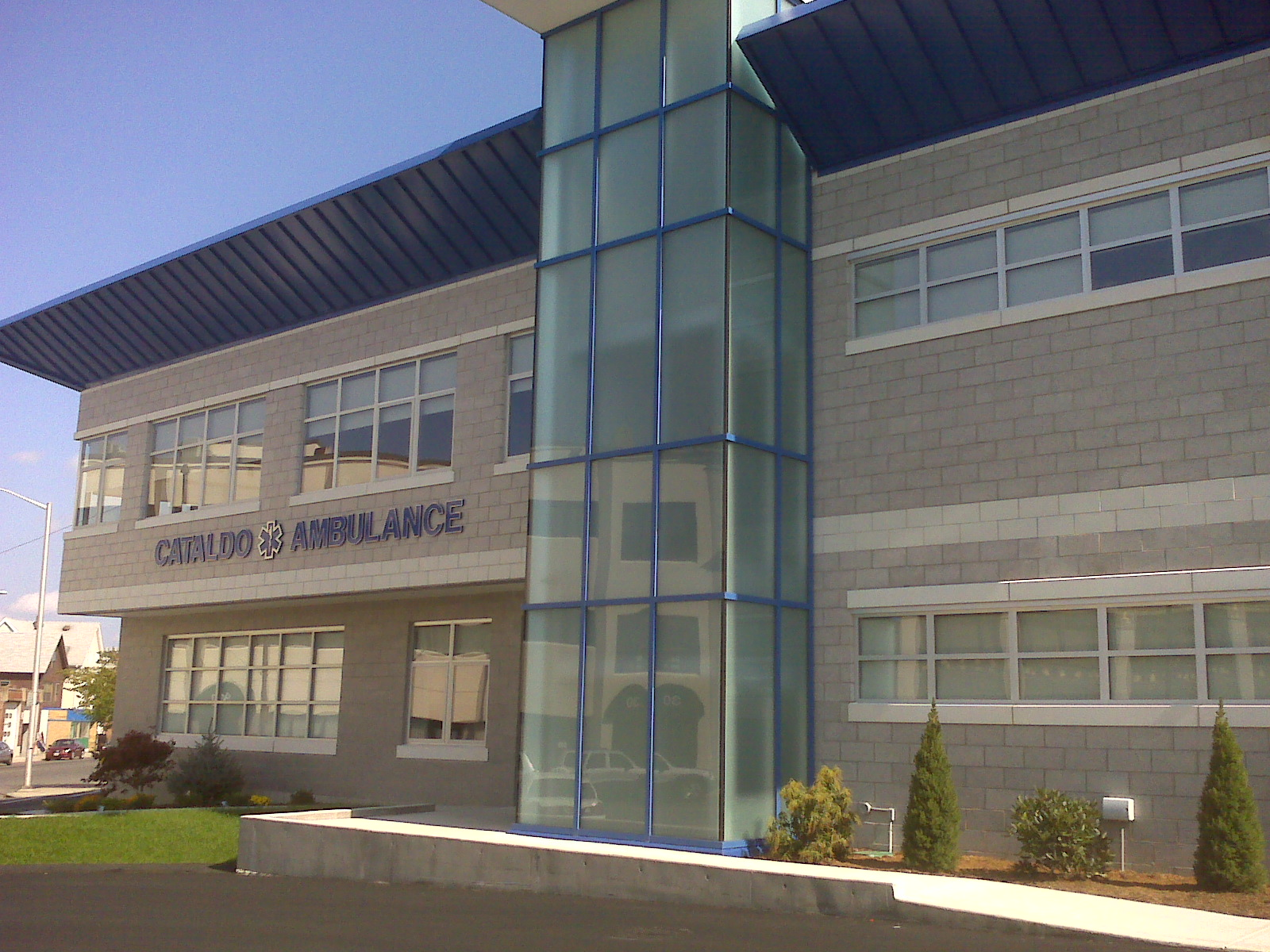
- Type: Private
- Industry: Emergency medical services
- Founded: 1977
- Founders: Bob Cataldo; Diana Cataldo
- Headquarters: Somerville, Massachusetts, United States
- Area served: Massachusetts
- Key people: Dennis Cataldo (president and CEO)
- Brands: Atlantic Ambulance Service; SmartCare
- Services: Municipal ambulance coverage; Non-emergent medical transport; Mobile integrated health; Special event medical coverage
- Number of employees: 900 (2018)
- Website: cataldoambulance.com

Cataldo Ambulance Service is a privately owned medical transport company based in Somerville, Massachusetts. Licensed at the advanced life support (ALS) level by the Massachusetts Department of Public Health, Cataldo provides emergency medical services, non-emergent ambulance and wheelchair van transportation, and mobile integrated health services in the Boston, North Shore, and Western regions of the state.

== History ==
=== Early years (1977–1990s) ===
Bob and Diana Cataldo founded the company in 1977 as Somerville Ambulance Service, starting with two ambulances and three employees serving Somerville. In 1982, Cataldo became the sole 9-1-1 provider for Chelsea and began offering advanced life support (ALS) services. The company made its first acquisition in 1986, purchasing Caggiano Ambulance Service along with the Winthrop contract.

In 1995, Chelsea put its ambulance contract out to bid; the city initially awarded the contract to CareLine Ambulance. CareLine's subsequent acquisition by Laidlaw prevented the new arrangement from taking effect, and Cataldo continued providing service while pursuing litigation. The dispute culminated in a decision that clarified aspects of municipal procurement in Massachusetts.

=== Expansion and growth (2000s–2017) ===
In 2003, Cataldo acquired Atlantic Ambulance, adding a North Shore division that retained the Atlantic name and service area. In 2008, Atlantic was awarded the Peabody contract and purchased Northshore Ambulance, adding the Salem and Marblehead 9-1-1 contracts along with 13 ambulances, six chair cars and two supervisor vehicles.

In 2009, Cataldo opened a 24-hour dispatch and training hub in Malden while maintaining its Somerville headquarters.

In 2017, Cataldo acquired Lyons Ambulance—founded in 1904 and described in local reporting as the state's oldest EMS provider—gaining contracts with Danvers, East Boxford and Wenham, as well as backup ALS service for Essex, Gloucester, Manchester-by-the-Sea and Rockport.

=== Innovation and recent developments (2019–2025) ===
In 2019, Cataldo received a waiver from the Massachusetts Office of Emergency Medical Services to launch “SmartCare,” reported as the state's first licensed mobile-integrated-health (MIH) program. During the COVID-19 pandemic, the company staffed large-scale testing and vaccination sites, including a clinic at Fenway Park where company personnel reported administering more than 65,000 vaccinations.

In October 2022, Cataldo became the primary EMS provider for Holyoke after the prior vendor withdrew, marking an expansion into Western Massachusetts. In November 2024, the company purchased a 5,900-square-foot property on Worcester’s West Side for $1.15 million to support further operations in Central Massachusetts.

=== Contract losses (2018–2025) ===
Between 2018 and 2025, Cataldo lost or relinquished ten municipal 9-1-1 contracts; in several communities, officials cited response-time or compliance concerns.

On May 30, 2018, Saugus awarded its contract to Armstrong Ambulance following a competitive process. Wenham ended its contract on August 31, 2020, after launching a town-run ambulance service. Newton selected Transformative Healthcare/Fallon (now Coastal Medical Transportation Systems) effective December 31, 2020, and Waltham moved to Armstrong on May 5, 2021.

Danvers chose Northeast Regional Ambulance effective June 30, 2023. Wellesley terminated its contract and selected Coastal Medical Transportation Systems effective January 20, 2024. Stoneham named Armstrong as its new vendor effective June 30, 2024. Melrose discontinued its municipal ambulance on June 30, 2025, designating Armstrong as the primary provider; Cataldo had served as backup. In late 2025, Swampscott and Marblehead planned to transition primary ambulance service to Beauport Ambulance.

In July 2025, Cataldo was awarded the municipal 9‑1‑1 contract for Winthrop, effective September 8, 2025. The move marked a return to the community, which Cataldo had previously served for 23 years between 1986 and 2011. Town officials cited Cataldo's strong regional coverage and its plan to operate from an existing facility within Winthrop as key factors in the decision.

In January 2026, Cataldo was awarded the municipal 9-1-1 contract for Medford, effective January 19, 2026. This marked a massive win for Cataldo Ambulance obtaining a new contract that belonged to regional competitor Armstrong Ambulance for the last 25 years. This also came with outrage from Armstrong Ambulance union and City Council as the Mayor and Fire Chief made this decision without their involvement.

As of May 2026, Cataldo retains municipal 9-1-1 contracts in Boxford, Chelsea, Everett, Holyoke, Lawrence, Lynn, Malden, Medford, Newburyport, Peabody, Revere, Salem, Salisbury, Somerville, Wakefield, West Newbury and Winthrop.

== Operations ==
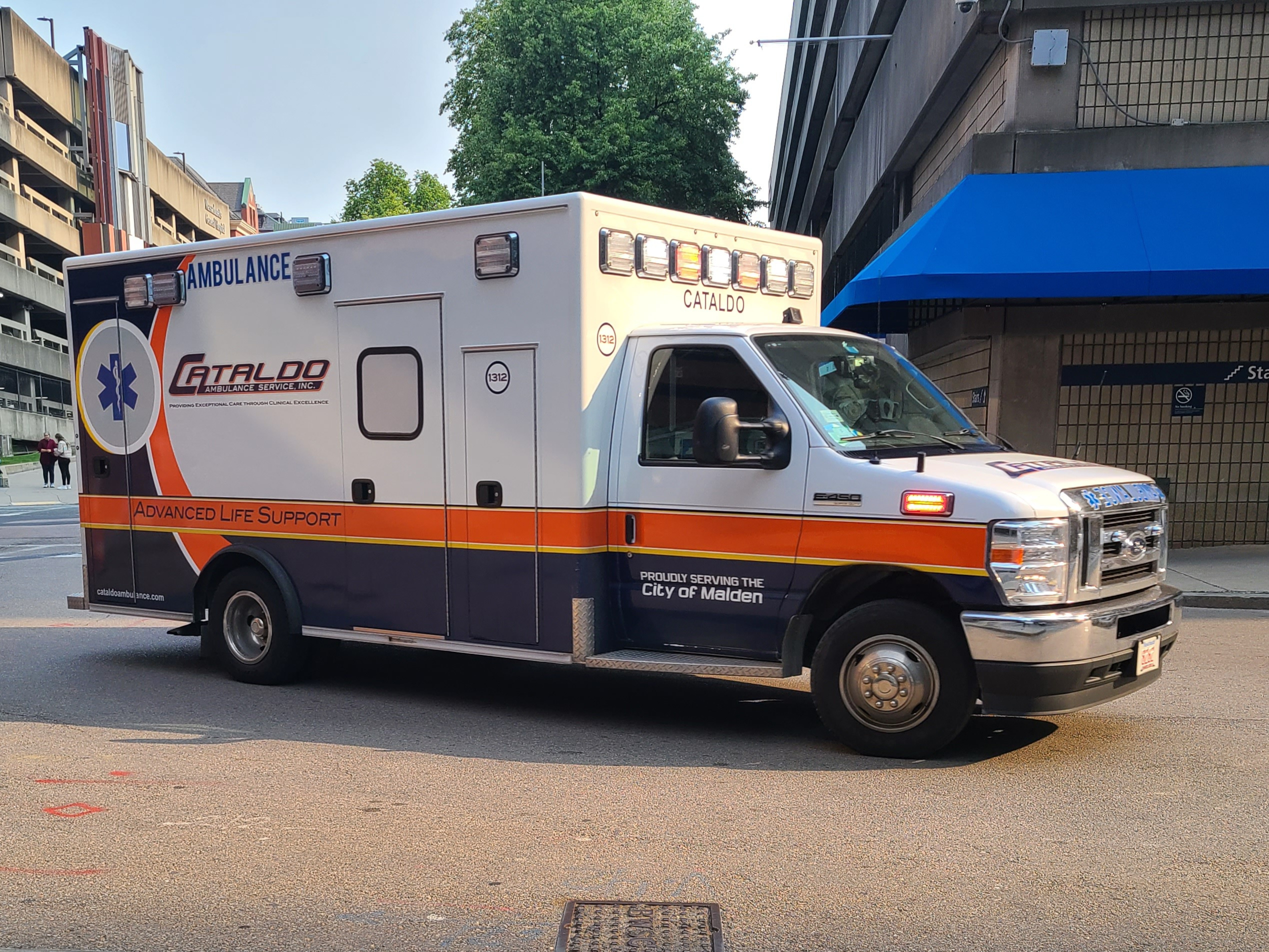
A Cataldo ambulance, assigned to the City of Malden, arriving at Massachusetts General Hospital

=== Municipal 9‑1‑1 and emergency‑medical dispatch ===
Cataldo supplies ALS ambulances under contract to municipalities and, through the Metro North Regional Emergency Communications Center, provides emergency‑medical‑dispatch for several others. The company provides over 50,000 emergency medical transportations annually through its municipal 9-1-1 contracts.

=== Interfacility, bariatric, and wheelchair transport ===
The company operates bariatric units for patients exceeding 500 lb (230 kg) and wheelchair‑accessible "chair cars" for non‑ambulance medical appointments.

=== SmartCare mobile‑integrated health ===
Launched in 2019 as Massachusetts's first licensed Mobile Integrated Health (MIH) program, SmartCare utilizes highly trained paramedics to deliver urgent medical care services in patients' homes. The program aims to reduce unnecessary emergency department visits by providing comprehensive treatment options in out-of-hospital settings. SmartCare paramedics carry point‑of‑care labs, 12‑lead ECGs and tele‑video links to physicians, allowing them to serve as an extension of patients' medical teams.

=== Special‑event medical coverage ===
- Fenway Park – exclusive EMS provider (2022–2026) for Boston Red Sox games and special events.
- TD Garden – on‑site ALS and first‑aid teams for Bruins, Celtics and concerts.
- Warrior Arena – special event medical services.

=== Special operations and surge resources ===
- Incident Support Unit (Tango 2) – climate‑controlled rehab, SCBA refill and satellite communications.
- Mass‑casualty trailer – 50‑patient treatment capacity; staged at large events.
- Bike and UTV teams – ALS mountain‑bike pairs and Polaris Mule units for dense crowds.

=== Fleet, bases, and communications ===
Cataldo operates from 25 base locations throughout Greater Boston, the North Shore, Central and Western Massachusetts. As of October 2022, state licensing data listed 93 transport units (48 Cataldo, 45 Atlantic). Dispatch operations run from a 24‑hour center at 25 Eastern Avenue, Malden.

=== Education and workforce development ===
The Cataldo Education Center, relocated to Woburn in 2024, offers a comprehensive 14-month paramedic training program featuring cognitive, psychomotor, and affective learning techniques. The program includes instruction, practical skill sessions, simulation, clinical practice, and field internship. The Paramedic Training Program is partnered with Endicott College, offering 29 credits towards a bachelor's degree upon admission. The center also provides EMT certification and AHA BLS/ACLS/PALS certification courses.

== Legal and regulatory issues ==
=== Chelsea contract dispute (1995–1998) ===
In 1995, as Cataldo's long-standing Chelsea contract approached expiration, the city—under state receivership since 1991 due to a reported $9.5 million budget deficit—reviewed its costs for emergency medical services. Officials found that other municipalities were paying substantially less than the $90,000 per year then paid to Cataldo and, after unsuccessful attempts to negotiate a lower rate, chose to solicit competitive bids.

The city's invitation for bids specified a requirement for one basic life support (BLS) ambulance, garaged in Chelsea and staffed with two EMT-Basics 24 hours a day, at zero cost to the municipality. Although the bid document referenced the Massachusetts Uniform Procurement Act (G.L. c. 30B), ambulance contracts are expressly exempt from the statute. Two companies responded: Cataldo, which met the stated specifications exactly, and CareLine Ambulance Service of Santa Ana, California, which proposed providing an advanced life support (ALS) ambulance with two paramedics at the same zero cost.

Cataldo's cover letter acknowledged the exemption, stating: “As you know, ambulance services are exempt from the Procurement Act, therefore, due to our standing and investment in the community, and in order to maintain continuity, we are requesting the opportunity of last refusal.” On June 29, 1995, the city awarded the contract to CareLine. That same month, CareLine announced plans to merge with Laidlaw's MedTrans unit, with shareholder approval later that year. CareLine never began service in Chelsea during the acquisition and transition period, and Cataldo continued operating under its prior arrangement.

Cataldo filed suit on July 27, 1995, arguing that the city's references to c. 30B created a binding obligation to follow its requirements, and that CareLine's bid should have been deemed “non-responsive” for deviating from the stated specifications. A Superior Court judge granted summary judgment for Chelsea and CareLine, holding that Cataldo could not reasonably rely on the city's references to the statute given its own acknowledgement of the exemption.

In 1997, the Massachusetts Appeals Court reversed in part, ruling in Cataldo's favor against the city. The court declared CareLine's bid “null and void” and awarded Cataldo damages for its bid-preparation costs, but noted that ambulance contracts are exempt from c. 30B and that the city retained authority to award services on a non-competitive basis.

On further appellate review, the Massachusetts Supreme Judicial Court in 1998 affirmed the original Superior Court ruling for the city. The SJC concluded that when both bids met minimum criteria at zero cost, Chelsea could lawfully award the contract to a bidder offering a higher service level; that Cataldo could not claim reasonable reliance on statutory procedures it acknowledged as inapplicable; and that municipal discretion applies when statutory procurement rules do not.

Following the Appeals Court's decision and given that CareLine never implemented service, Chelsea did not re-bid the contract. Cataldo has continued to provide ambulance service to the city. The case is cited as a precedent in Massachusetts municipal procurement law and is often referenced in later disputes involving bid specifications, statutory exemptions, and municipal discretion in awarding emergency services contracts.

=== Subsequent regulatory issues ===
In February 2009 the Massachusetts Attorney General entered an assurance of discontinuance with Cataldo over balance‑billing of auto‑crash patients. Cataldo refunded affected patients, paid US$100,000 and revised its billing protocols.

A June 2016 audit by the Office of the State Auditor found Cataldo lacked Medical Necessity Forms for wheelchair‑van trips billed to MassHealth, putting up to US$942,000 in payments at risk.

Later in 2016 the Attorney General sued Cataldo for allegedly up‑coding BLS transports as ALS, seeking roughly US$600,000; the suit remains in discovery.

In June 2019 the Massachusetts Commission Against Discrimination ordered Cataldo to reinstate an EMT fired while on pregnancy‑related bed‑rest and pay back wages, interest and punitive damages; the order was affirmed in 2023.

The most recent action came in September 2021, when HHS‑OIG fined Cataldo US $704,706 for billing Medicare Part B for transports already covered under skilled‑nursing‑facility consolidated billing and placed the firm under a three‑year compliance plan.

== See also ==
- Emergency medical services in the United States
