= Renato Cataldi =

Brazilian painter

- Born: 25 December 1909; São Paulo, Brazil
- Died: 29 May 1981 (aged 71); Rio de Janeiro, Brazil
- Known for: Oil Painting

Renato Cataldi (born December 25, 1909, São Paulo, Brazil; died May 29, 1981, Rio de Janeiro, Brazil) was a Brazilian painter. Cataldi is catalogued in the Julius Louzada's Dictionary of Arts, and won several awards from the annual Salon organised by Escola Nacional de Belas Artes.

Cataldi, who lived and painted in and around the city of Rio de Janeiro, focused on landscapes, seascapes, marine subjects and nature scenes featuring exotic birds of various species from trees, as if they were loose in nature. His paintings often appear at large international auction houses.
