= San Cataldo =

San Cataldo may refer to:

== Places in Italy ==
- Chiesa di San Cataldo, a church in the City of Palermo, Sicily
- San Cataldo, Erice, a church in Erice, Sicily
- San Cataldo Nature Reserve, in the Province of Lecce
- San Cataldo di Lecce, Apulia
- San Cataldo, Sicily, a commune in the Province of Caltanissetta

== People ==
- Catald, Irish saint, Bishop of Taranto, Italian name San Cataldo
