= Maturin Veyssière La Croze =

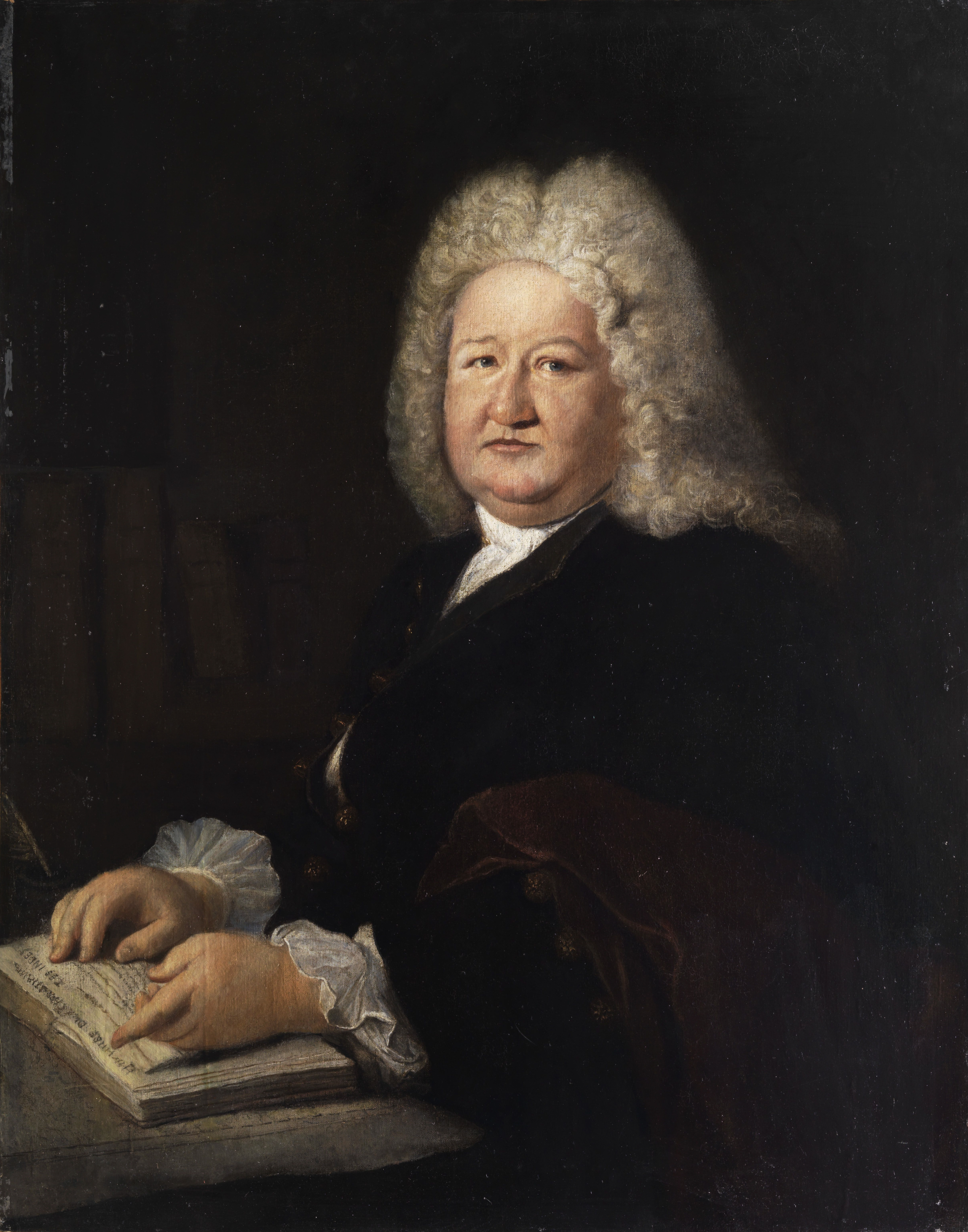
- Mathurin Veyssière de La Croze (copy after Antoine Pesne)
- Born: 4 December 1661; Nantes, France
- Died: 21 May 1739 (aged 77); Berlin, Germany

Academic work
- Discipline: Oritental studies

Maturinus Veyssière La Croze (4 December 1661, Nantes – 21 May 1739) was in his early years a learned French Benedictine historian and orientalist. Later, as a Protestant convert, he became royal librarian and professor of the University of Berlin Armenologist.

He received his first education from his father, who owned a private library. In 1677 his family got into financial difficulties and he became a novice in Saint-Florent de Saumur. He studied theology in Le Mans and by 1682 he was a Benedictine at the Abbey of Saint-Germain-des-Prés in Paris. In 1696 he came into trouble with his prior and fled to Basel, where he received support from Swiss Reformed professors Peter Werenfels and J. Buxtorf and converted to the Reformed Church. A year later, he became a Prussian royal librarian in Berlin. He also was a teacher for several members of the royal family. Since 1725 he was also professor of philosophy at the French Collegium in Berlin. He left many unpublished works and a considerable private library. Besides French, he spoke Latin, German, Armenian, and some Semitic and Slavic languages. Among his unpublished works were four dictionaries in Coptic, Armenian, Slavic and Syriac.

His works include Vindiciae veterum scriptorum contra J. Hardunium' (1708), the Histoire du christianisme des Indes (1724), Histoire du Christianisme d'Ethiopie et d'Arménie (1739), and a Coptic-Latin dictionary.

== Bibliography ==
- Vindiciae veterum scriptorum, contra J. Harduinum S. J. P. Rotterdam, 1708 (Latin)
- Manuscript of La Coze´s Coptic - Latin dictionary, dated 1721, kept in Leiden (Or. 431 B).
- Lexicon Ægyptiaco-Latinum ex veteribus illus linguae monumentis summo studio collectum et elaboratum. Quod in compendium redegit, ita ut nullae voces Aegyptiacae, nullae que earum significationes omitterentur, Christianus Scholtz, Oxford, Clarendon Press, 1775. The dictionary manuscript of La Croze was further enhanced and improved by Christian Scholtz (or Scholz) and edited in print by Karl Gottfried Woide (Coptic and Latin).
- Histoire du christianisme aux Indes, 1724
- Histoire du christianisme d’Ethiopie et d’Arménie, 1739
- Translated Nerses IV the Gracious's poem "Jesus the Son" from Armenian
- A historical grammar, translated into English and enlarged by Caleb Bingham

== Notes ==
- Շրումպֆ Ա., Ուսումնասիրութիւնք հայ լեզուի եւ մատենագրութեան յարևմուտս (ԺԴ.-ԺԹ. դար), թարգմանեց եւ լրացուց Գ. Զարբհանալեան, Venice, 1895 (in Armenian)
- Հայկական համառոտ հանրագիտարան, vol. 2, Yerevan, 1995, p. 399 (in Armenian)
