= Codex Seidelianus I =

Greek manuscript of the Gospels

Uncial 011
- New Testament manuscript
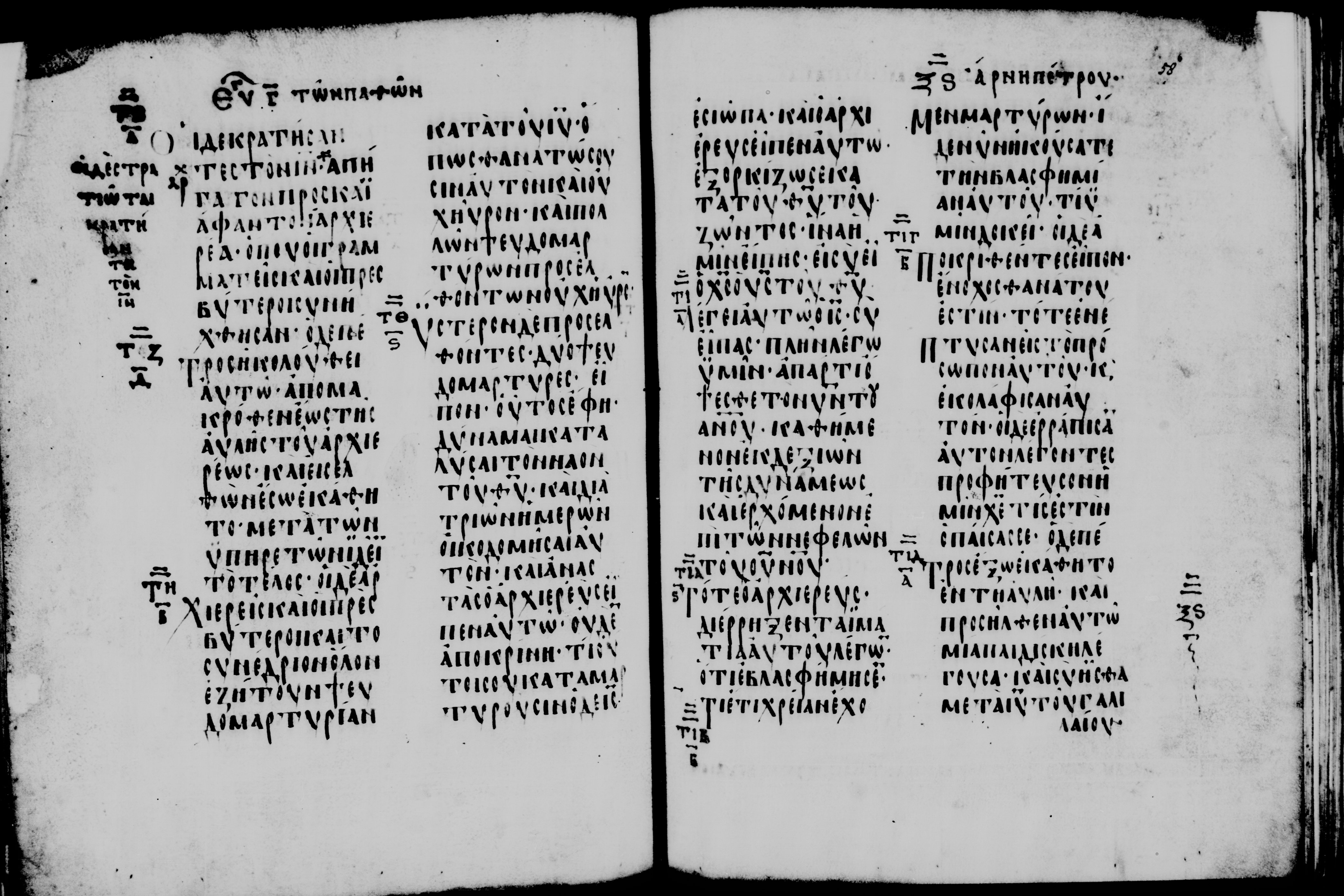
- Codex Seidelianus I
- Name: Seidelianus I
- Sign: G^{e}
- Text: Gospels
- Date: 9th century
- Script: Greek
- Now at: British Library
- Size: 25.7 cm by 21.5 cm
- Type: Byzantine text-type
- Category: V
- Hand: coarse

Codex Seidelianus I, also known as Codex Wolfii A and Codex Harleianus, is a Greek uncial manuscript of the Gospels written on parchment. It is designated by the siglum G^{e} or 011 in the Gregory-Aland numbering of New Testament manuscripts, and ε 87 in the von Soden numbering of New Testament manuscripts. Using the study of comparative writing styles (palaeography), it has been assigned to the 9th or 10th century. The manuscript has some missing portions.

== Description ==
The manuscript is a codex (precursor to the modern book format), containing the text of the four Gospels written on 252 parchment leaves (25.7 cm by 21.5 cm), with some gaps (Matthew 1:1-6:6, 7:25-8:9, 8:23-9:2, 28:18-Mark 1:13, Mark 14:19-25, Luke 1:1-13, 5:4-7:3, 8:46-9:5, 12:27-41, 24:41-end, John 18:5-19, 19:4-27). The text is written 2 columns per page, 21 lines per page, by a "coarse hand."

The text is divided according to the Ammonian Sections, whose numbers are given in the margin, with references to the Eusebian Canons (both early divisions of the gospels into referential sections). It contains the chapter titles (known as τιτλοι / titloi). It has breathings and accents, but often irregularly. Each person mentioned anew in the genealogy in Luke 3 forms a separate line. Some of the missing portions are supplied on new pages by a later hand.

== Text ==
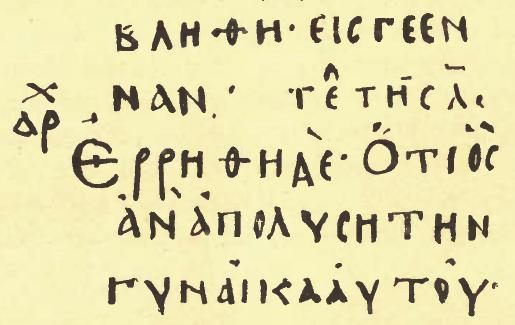
Scrivener's ficsimile with text of Matthew 5:30-31

The Greek text of this codex is considered to be a secondary representative of the Byzantine text-type, with many of the non-Byzantine readings appearing to reflect the Caesarean text-type. The text-types are groups of different New Testament manuscripts which share specific or generally related readings, which then differ from each other group, and thus the conflicting readings can separate out the groups. These are then used to determine the original text as published; there are three main groups with names: Alexandrian, Western, and Byzantine. The Caesarean text-type however (initially identified by biblical scholar Burnett Hillman Streeter) has been contested by several text-critics, such as Kurt and Barbara Aland.

Kurt Aland gave it the textual profile 176^{1} 87^{1/2} 4^{2} 21^{s}: this means the text agrees with the Byzantine majority in 176 readings, 87 readings which it shares with the Byzantine and the "original" text, 4 agreements with the original text, and 21 distinctive readings; all of these are from specific "test" passages, chosen by Kurt Aland. Aland placed it in Category V of his New Testament manuscript classification system. Category V manuscripts are described as having "a purely or predominantly Byzantine text."

Textual critic Hermann von Soden classified it to the family K^{i}. According to the Claremont Profile Method (a specific analysis of textual data), it belongs to the textual family K^{x} in Luke chapter 1, 20, and 20.

== History ==
The codex was brought from the East to Germany by scholar Andrew Erasmus Seidel († 1718). After his death in 1718, it was acquired by Maturin Veyssière de La Croze, the royal librarian in Berlin, and presented to Johann Christoph Wolf, who published extracts from its text in 1723. The codex was barbarously mutilated in 1721 in order to send pieces to Bentley. Most of them were purchased by Eduard Harley. Some fragments were found by biblical scholar Samuel P. Tregelles in 1845. Tregelles collated its text in 1847.

The codex was known to textual critic Johann J. Wettstein, who gave it the siglum G. Textual critic Johann J. Griesbach designated it by the same siglum.

It later became part of the library of Edward Harley, and is now located in the British Library (shelf number Harley MS 5684), and one page, which Wolff gave to Richard Bentley, is in Cambridge (Trinity College B. XVII. 20).

== See also ==
- List of New Testament uncials
- Textual criticism
