= Annaclara Cataldi Palau =

Italian palaeographer (1950–2026)

Annaclara Cataldi Palau dei Baroni Cataldi (January 1940 – October 2026) was an Italian palaeographer who specialised in Greek mediaeval and renaissance palaeography and history of the book.

== Life and career ==
Annaclara Cataldi was born in Genoa in 1940. She studied classics at the University of Genoa, then lived several years in Paris and studied Greek palaeography at the Sorbonne. Her studies there culminated in a ‘Doctorat’ in Greek Palaeography. In 1994 she was commissioned to catalogue the Greek manuscripts in the Bodleian Library, Oxford, published 2011. She was visiting professor in the Department of Classics at King's College London 2000–2005 and visiting professor in Greek Palaeography at Royal Holloway, University of London, The Hellenic Institute, from 2011–2016; she was Cultore della materia at Università Cattolica del Sacro Cuore, Milano from 2015–2018.

In palaeography she proposed new criteria to distinguish 8th-century manuscripts from those of the 9th century: the development of accentuation and the regularity of the accentuation suggest a date in the 9th century; while abundant colourful decoration is uncharacteristic of the eighth century. Rich ornamentation is infrequent in 8th-century manuscripts, which mostly have uncomplicated initials.

Cataldi Palau died in October 2026.

== Works ==
- Cataldi Palau, A. (1990). Catalogo dei manoscritti greci della Biblioteca Franzoniana (Genova). Supplemento n. 8 al «Bollettino dei Classici». Vol. I: Urbani 2–20. Rome: Accademia Nazionale dei Lincei – Bardi Editore Commerciale.
- Cataldi Palau, A. (1996). Catalogo dei manoscritti greci della Biblioteca Franzoniana (Genova). Supplemento n. 17 al «Bollettino dei Classici». Vol. II: Urbani 21–40. Rome: Accademia Nazionale dei Lincei – Bardi Editore Commerciale.
- Cataldi Palau, A. (2008). Studies in Greek Manuscripts. Testi, Studi, Strumenti, 24. Vol. I–II. Spoleto: CISAM—Centro Italiano di Studi sull'Alto Medioevo. ISBN 978-88-7988-413-6. (Kleine Schriften)
- Cataldi Palau, A. (2011). A Catalogue of Greek Manuscripts from the Meerman Collection in the Bodleian Library. University of Oxford: The Bodleian Library. ISBN 978-1-85124-364-8.
- Cataldi Palau, A. (2021). The Angela Burdett-Coutts Collection of Greek Manuscripts. Bibliologia, 62. Turnhout: Brepols. ISBN 978-2-503-59376-0.
- "La biblioteca del Cardinale Giovanni Salviati: Alcuni nuovi manoscritti greci in biblioteche diverse della Vaticana", in: Scriptorium: Revue internationale des études relative aux manuscrits; 49 (1995)
- Gian Francesco d'Asola e la tipografia aldina: La vita, le edizioni, la biblioteca dell'Asolano, Genoa: Sagep Libri & Communicazione, 1998
- "A Little Known Manuscript of the Gospels in ‘Maiuscola biblica’: Basil. Gr A. N. III. 12", in: Byzantion; 74 (2004): 463-516
- "The Burdett-Coutts collection of Greek manuscripts: manuscripts from Epirus" in: Codices Manuscripti (2006), 31-64
