= Textual variants in the Gospel of Matthew =

Differences in New Testament manuscripts

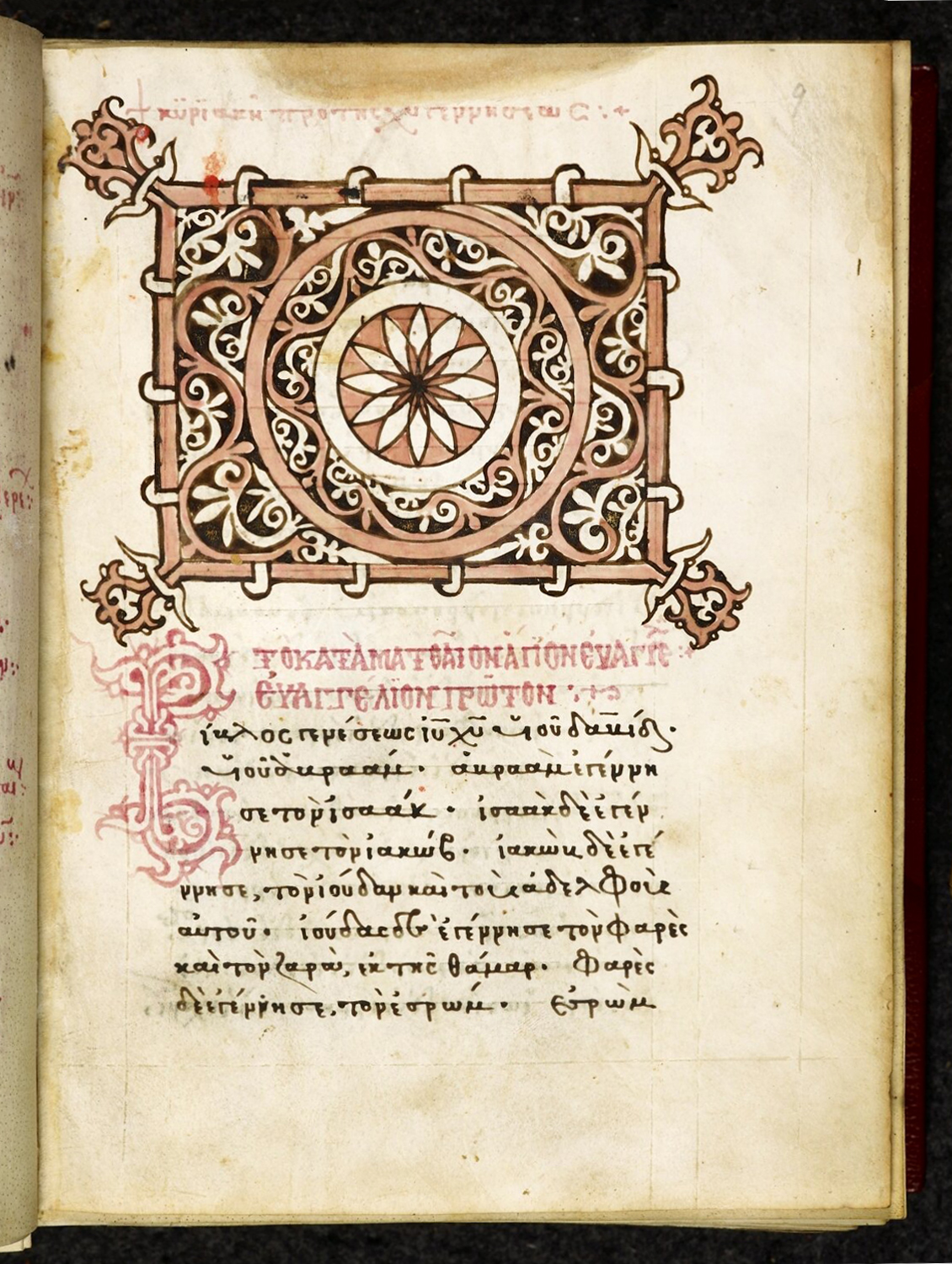
Beginning of the Gospel of Matthew in Minuscule 447

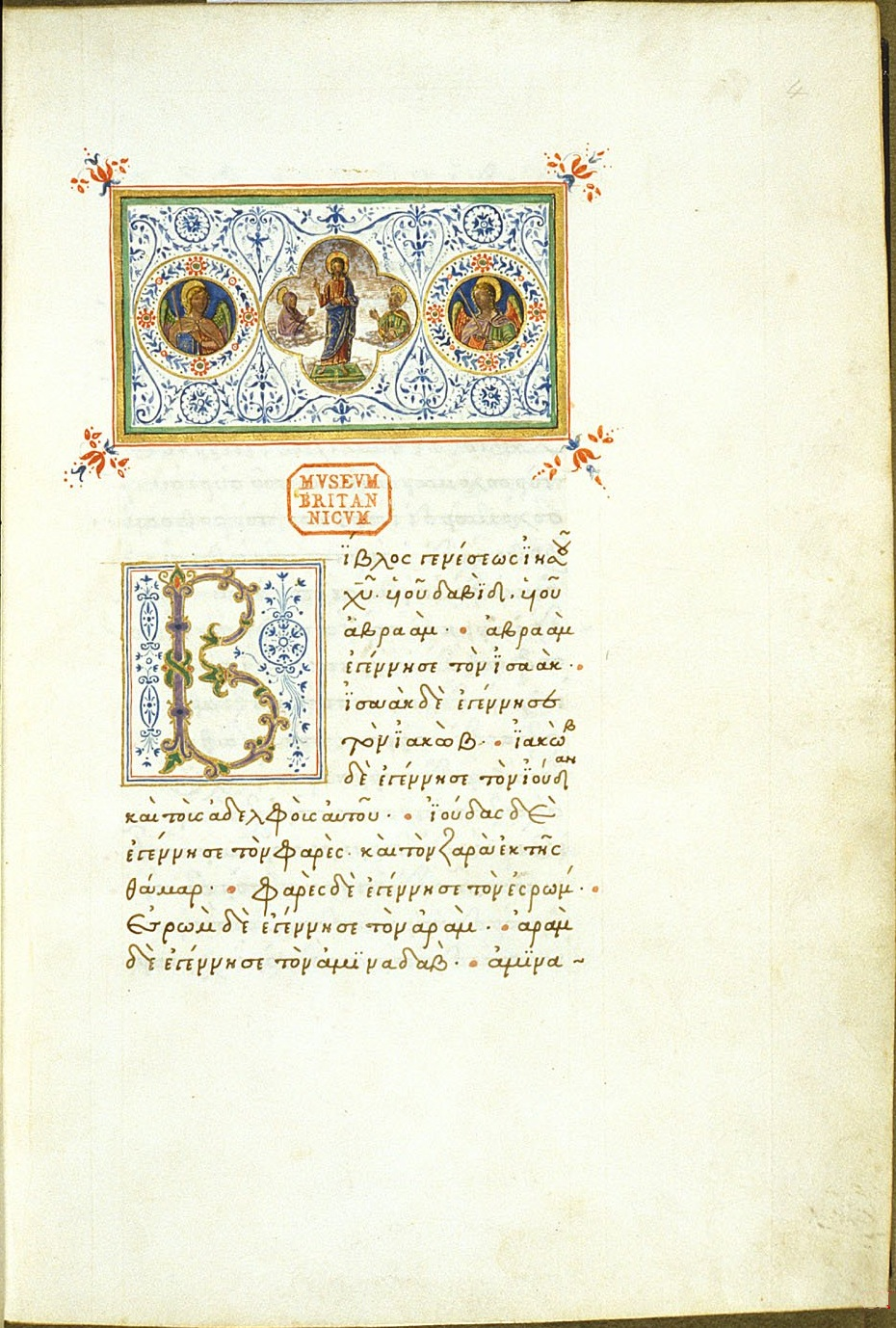
Beginning of the Gospel of Matthew in Minuscule 448

Textual variants in the Gospel of Matthew are the subject of the study called textual criticism of the New Testament. Textual variants in manuscripts arise when a copyist makes deliberate or inadvertent alterations to a text that is being reproduced. An abbreviated list of textual variants in this particular book is given in this article below.

Origen, writing in the 3rd century, was one of the first who made remarks about differences between manuscripts of texts that were eventually collected as the New Testament. He declared his preferences among variant readings. For example, in Matthew 27:16–17, he favored "Barabbas" against "Jesus Barabbas" (In Matt. Comm. ser. 121). "Gergeza" was preferred over "Geraza" or "Gadara" (Commentary on John VI.40 (24) – see Matthew 8:28).

Most of the variations are not significant and some common alterations include the deletion, rearrangement, repetition, or replacement of one or more words when the copyist's eye returns to a similar word in the wrong location of the original text. If their eye skips to an earlier word, they may create a repetition (error of dittography). If their eye skips to a later word, they may create an omission. They may resort to performing a rearranging of words to retain the overall meaning without compromising the context. In other instances, the copyist may add text from memory from a similar or parallel text in another location. Otherwise, they may also replace some text of the original with an alternative reading. Spellings occasionally change. Synonyms may be substituted. A pronoun may be changed into a proper noun (such as "he said" becoming "Jesus said"). John Mill's 1707 Greek New Testament was estimated to contain some 30,000 variants in its accompanying textual apparatus which was based on "nearly 100 [Greek] manuscripts." Peter J. Gurry puts the number of non-spelling variants among New Testament manuscripts around 500,000, though he acknowledges his estimate is higher than all previous ones.

The critical editions of the Gospel of Matthew are based on all available papyri: Papyrus 1, Papyrus 19, Papyrus 21, Papyrus 25, Papyrus 35, Papyrus 37, Papyrus 44, Papyrus 45, Papyrus 53, Papyrus 62, Papyrus 64, Papyrus 70, Papyrus 71, Papyrus 77, Papyrus 86, and on the following uncials: 01, 02, 03, 04, 05, 019, 032, 035, 038, 058, 064, 067, 071, 073, 074, 078, 084, 085, 087, 089, 090, 092a, 094, 0104, 0106, 0107, 0118, 0119, 0128, 0135, 0136, 0137, 0138, 0148, 0160, 0161, 0164, 0170, 0171, 0197, 0200, 0204, 0231, 0234, 0237, 0242, 0249, 0255, 0271, 0275.

Note: This running list of textual variants is nonexhaustive, and is continually being updated in accordance with the modern critical publications of the Greek New Testament — United Bible Societies' Fifth Revised Edition (UBS5) published in 2014, Novum Testamentum Graece: Nestle-Aland 28th Revised Edition of the Greek New Testament (NA28) published in 2012, and Novum Testamentum Graecum: Editio Critica Maior (ECM) last published in 2017 — and supplemented by nonmodern publications wherever applicable, including those of Hodges & Farstad, Greeven, Lachmann, Legg, Merk, Nestle-Aland editions 25–27, Aland's Synopsis Quattuor Evangeliorum (SQE), Souter, Swanson, Tischendorf, Tregelles, von Soden, and Westcott & Hort.

== New Testament Sigla Legend ==
This is a guide to the sigla (symbols and abbreviations) most frequently used in citations of source material for a Greek New Testament (NT) manuscript. Editors of a scholarly critical text of the NT use each siglum to shrink the space needed for listing witnesses to a particular reading in the critical apparatus. The intended reader, a Bible translator, scholar, orator, or student, needs to know these abbreviations, e.g. for deciding whether to use alternative readings of the critical text or to understand the origin and attestation of a particular passage.

A manuscript may have a Gregory–Aland index number because it is a Greek minuscule (see list). However, if the number has a leading 0, it is a Greek uncial (see list) using the older majuscule script.

Besides these sigla and annotations, scholars often abbreviate other words and phrases after the manner of A Plain Introduction to the Criticism of the New Testament by Scrivener, which began a formalized system of collation, cataloguing, and jargon for NT textual critics in 1861.

General sigla and abbreviations

# beginning with 0: uncial
# not beginning with 0: minuscule
(), parenthesized: indirect or partial support or a reading or witness with a slight difference
^{*} superscript: original reading
^{app} superscript: the critical apparatus reading
^{c} superscript: scribal correction
^{com} superscript: Biblical commentary reading
^{1,2,3...} superscripts: 1st, 2nd, 3rd... scribal corrections
^{v.l.} superscript: varia lectio, i.e. alternative reading
^{mg} superscript: reading in the margin
^{ms} superscript: individual manuscript
^{mss} superscript: multiple manuscripts
^{pt} superscript: partial attestation
^{s} superscript: reading in a supplement to the text
^{txt} superscript: the reading of the text
^{vid.} superscript: videtur, i.e. apparent but uncertain reading
aeth or eth: Ethiopic versions
al: alii: i.e., others
arab: Arabic versions
arm: Armenian versions
Byz: Byzantine text-type in the Catholic letters and superscript:

pt: a part of the Codices Byzantini

cop: Coptic versions

ac or akh: Akhmimic version
ac^{2}: Subakhmimic or Lycopolitanic version
bo: Boharic version
cv: Dialect V
cw: Dialect W
fa or fay or mf: Fayyumic Version
mae: Middle Egyptian or Mesokemic version
pbo: Proto-Bohartic version
sa: Sahidic version

ƒ: individually-numbered Greek manuscript family - superscripts:

1: Family 1
13: Family 13

geo: Georgian versions
goth: Gothic versions
𝕲: The Greek Old Testament text, i.e. Septuagint (LXX)
𝕳: The Hebrew Old Testament text, i.e. the Masoretic Text
it: Italic/Vetus Latina, lowercase letters for individual Old Latin manuscripts
lat: most Italic and Vulgate
latt: all Italic and Vulgate
P or 𝔓: papyrus
𝑙 or ℓ: individually numbered lectionary
Lect: most or all numbered lectionaries
𝔐: Greek Majority text and superscripts:

A: Andreas of Caesarea commentary in Revelation
C: Complutensian tradition
K: the Koine tradition in Revelation

o: omits
pc: pauci: i.e., few
pm: permulti: i.e., many
rell.: reliqui, i.e., the remaining ones (manuscripts) in the context
slav: Slavic versions in Old Church Slavonic
syr or sy: Syriac versions and superscripts:

c or cur: Curetonian Gospels
s: Sinaitic Palimpsest
h: Harclean Syriac
hmg: Harclean Syriac, margin
pal: Palestinian Syriac
p: the Peshitta

vg: Latin Vulgate manuscripts (capital letters)

A: Codex Amiatinus
F: Codex Fuldensis
gig: Codex Gigas (Old Latin in Acts and Revelation)
Σ or S: Codex Sangallensis 1395

Major manuscripts: Capital letters, Greek/Hebrew sigla, and it^{superscript}

Greek Uncials, siglum or Gregory–Aland number with a leading 0

א: Codex Sinaiticus (01)
A: Codex Alexandrinus (02)
B: Codex Vaticanus (03)
C: Codex Ephraemi Rescriptus (04)
D^{ea}: Codex Bezae (05)
D^{p}: Codex Claromontanus (06)
E: Codex Basilensis A. N. III. 12 (07)
E^{a}: Codex Laudianus (08)
F^{e}: Codex Boreelianus (09)
F^{p}: Codex Augiensis (010)
G^{e}: Codex Seidelianus I (011)
G^{p}: Codex Boernerianus (012)
H^{e}: Codex Seidelianus II (013)
H^{a}: Codex Mutinensis (014)
H^{p}: Codex Coislinianus (015)
I: Codex Freerianus (016)
K^{e}: Codex Cyprius (017)
K^{ap}: Codex Mosquensis I (018)
L^{e}: Codex Regius (New Testament) (019)
L^{ap}: Codex Angelicus (020)
M: Codex Campianus (021)
N: Codex Petropolitanus Purpureus (022)
O: Sinope Gospels (023)
P^{e}: Codex Guelferbytanus A (024)
P^{apr}: Codex Porphyrianus (025)
Q: Codex Guelferbytanus B (026)
R: Codex Nitriensis (027)
S: Codex Vaticanus 354 (028)
T: Codex Borgianus (029)
U: Codex Nanianus (030)
V: Codex Mosquensis II (031)
W: Codex Washingtonianus (032)
X: Codex Monacensis (X 033) (033)
Y: Codex Macedoniensis (034)
Z: Codex Dublinensis (035)
Γ: Codex Tischendorfianus IV (036)
Δ: Codex Sangallensis 48 (037)
Θ: Codex Koridethi (038)
Λ: Codex Tischendorfianus III (039)
Ξ: Codex Zacynthius (040)
Π: Codex Petropolitanus (041)
Σ: Rossano Gospels (042)
Φ: Codex Beratinus (043)
Ψ: Codex Athous Lavrensis (044)
Ω: Codex Athous Dionysiou (045)
0189: Uncial 0189
See list of other Uncials

Vetus Latina (Old Latin) Uncials, it or OL or 𝕷: with lowercase superscripts:

^{a}: Codex Vercellensis
^{b}: Codex Veronensis
^{d}: Codex Bezae (Gospels, Acts, 3 Jn)
^{d}: Codex Claromontanus (Paul)
^{e}: Codex Palatinus
^{f}: Codex Brixianus
ff^{1}: Codex Corbeiensis I
ff^{2}: Codex Corbeiensis II
^{g}: Codex Boernerianus
g^{1}: Codex Sangermanensis I
gig: Codex Gigas (Acts and Revelation)
^{h}: Codex Floriacensis
^{j}: Codex Purpureus Sarzanensis
^{k}: Codex Bobiensis
^{l}: Codex Rehdigeranus
r^{1}: Codex Usserianus Primus
^{s}: Codex Bobiensis
^{z}: Harley MS 1772
Other superscripts and Beuron numbers

Other manuscripts, sources, and printed texts

Other important manuscripts and sources

Greek Miniscules: See List (no leading 0)
1: Codex Basilensis A. N. IV. 2
2: Codex Basiliensis A. N. IV. 1
8: Minuscule 8
33: Minuscule 33
81: Minuscule 81
565: Minuscule 565
579: Minuscule 579
700: Minuscule 700
1241: Minuscule 1241
1739: Minuscule 1739
2344: Minuscule 2344
The Diatessaron gospel harmony
Church Fathers are cited when relevant
Ju: Justin Martyr
Or: Origen
Dion: Dionysius of Alexandria
Tert: Tertullian
Papyri: See List
𝔓^{13}: Papyrus 13
𝔓^{32}: Papyrus 32
𝔓^{45}: Papyrus 45 (P. Chester Beatty I)
𝔓^{66}: Papyrus 66
𝔓^{72}: Papyrus 72
𝔓^{74}: Papyrus 74
𝔓^{75}: Papyrus 75
Lectionaries: See List
ℓ 185: Lectionary 185
ℓ 211: Lectionary 211
ℓ 249: Lectionary 249
ℓ 253: Lectionary 253
ℓ 299: Lectionary 299
vg: Printed Latin Vulgate (lowercase superscripts)
cl: Editio Clementina
s: Editio Sixtina
st: Vulgata Stuttgartiensis 2007
ww: Wordsworth/White Vulgate

Printed New Testaments: critical and eclectic texts

Latin and Greek Majority texts
E: Erasmus, Novum Instrumentum omne (1516)
ς: The Textus Receptus (so-called) of Robert Estienne (1550)
Beza's Greek and Latin New Testament (1565 to 1611)
M: John Mill, Novum Testamentum Graecum, etc. (1707)
Bengel, Novum Testamentum Graecum (1734)
Wettstein, Novum Testamentum Graecum, etc. (1751)
Ma: Matthaei, Novum Testamentum Graecum, etc. (1803)
Griesbach, Novum Testamentum Graece, etc. (1809 to 1823)
L: Lloyd, Novum Testamentum Graecum (1828, 1836)
Ln: Lachmann, Novum Testamentum Graece et Latine (Greek and Latin, 1842, 1850)
Scr: Scrivener's Greek New Testaments (1877 to 1894)
𝔚: Wordsworth-White, Nouum Testamentum Domini nostri Jesu Christi latine (Latin, 1889)
vS: von Soden, Die Schriften des neuen Testaments, etc. (1902 to 1910)
Farstad and Hodges, The Greek New Testament According to the Majority Text with Apparatus (1982)
Modern Greek NTs with substantially Alexandrian texts
𝔗 or T8th: Tischendorf, Editio Octava Critica Maior (1864 to 1894)
WH: Westcott and Hort, The New Testament in the Original Greek (1881)
Weiss, Das Neue Testament (1894)
NA: Novum Testamentum Graece, Nestle–Aland, NA28 is latest (1898-)
UBS: United Bible Societies, Greek New Testament, UBS5 is latest (1966-)
ECM: Editio Critica Maior, updates to Tischendorf's 8th edition (1997-) (in progress)

== Textual variants ==
Textual variants in the Gospel of Matthew

15 Textual variants in Matthew 1

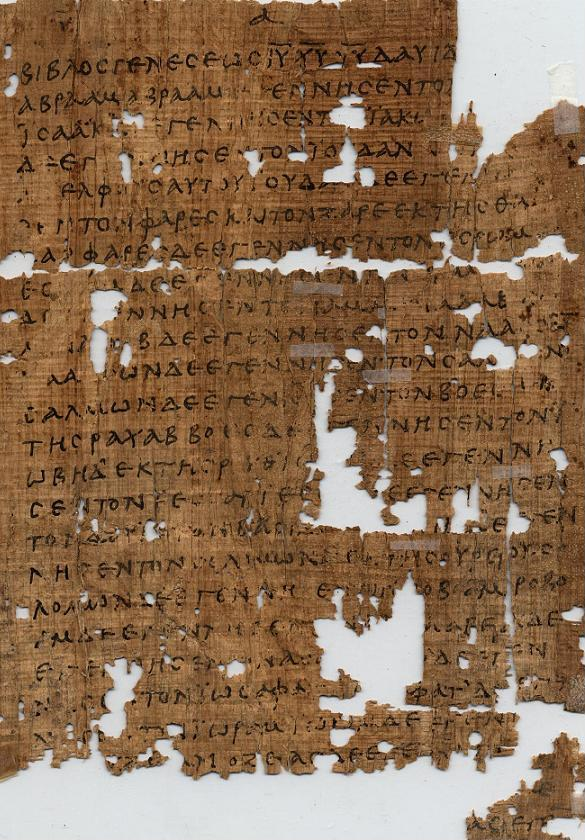
Papyrus 1 with text Matthew 1:1-9; in 1,3 it has a variant Ζαρε against Ζαρα

Matthew 1:3

Ζαρε — 𝔓^{1} B mae-1
Ζαρα — rell (i.e., all other extant manuscripts)

Matthew 1:6

Δαυιδ δε ο βασιλευς (Also David the king) — C K L W Δ Π 33 157 892 1071 𝔐/Byz it^{mss} vg syr^{h} geo
Δαυιδ δε (Also David) — 𝔓^{1} א B Γ ƒ^{1} ƒ^{13} 579 700 it^{g^{1},k} vg^{mss} syr^{s, c, p} cop arm Didymus

Matthew 1:9

Αχαζ — B L W Θ ƒ^{1} ƒ^{13} Byz
Αχας — א C g^{1}

Matthew 1:11

τον Ιωακιμ, Ιωακιμ δε εγεννησεν — M U Θ Σ ƒ^{1} 33 258 478 661 954 1216 1230 1354 1604 Lectionary 54 syr^{h} geo
omitted by majority

Matthew 1:12-13

γεννα – Β
εγεννησεν (begot) – א

Matthew 1:16

τον ανδρα Μαριας, εξ ης εγεννηθη Ιησους ο λεγομενος Χριστος – 𝔓^{1} א Β C K L P W (Δ omit τον) Π (ƒ^{1} omit Ιησους) 28 33 565 700 892 1009 1010 1071 1079 1195 1216 1230 1241 1242 1365 1546 1646 2148 2174, Byz, Lect, ℓ 76, ℓ 211, vg
ω μνηστευθεισα παρθενος Μαριαμ εγεννησεν Ιησουν τον λεγομενον Χριστον – Θ ƒ^{13}

Matthew 1:16

Ιησους (Jesus) – omitted by ƒ^{1}

Matthew 1:18

Ιησου (Jesus) — W
Χριστου (Christ) – 71 Latt syr^{s,c} Diatessaron^{syr} Theophilus Irenaeus^{lat} Chromatius Jerome^{pt} Augustine
Χριστου Ιησου (Christ Jesus) – B Origen^{pt} Jerome^{pt}
Ιησου Χριστου (Jesus Christ) — rell (𝔓^{1} א C E K L P Z Δ Θ Π Σ ƒ^{1} ƒ^{13}, most minuscules, Byz, Lect, syr^{p,h,pal} cop arm (eth) geo slav Diatessaron^{arm} Irenaeus^{gr} Origen^{pt} Eusebius Epiphanius Chrysostom)

Matthew 1:21

τεξεται δε σοι υιον (Then she will bring forth to you a son) – syr^{s,c}
τεξεται δε υιον (Then she will bring forth a son) – rell

Matthew 1:21

αυτος γαρ σωσει τον κοσμον (for he will save the world) — syr^{c}
αυτος γαρ σωσει τον λαον αυτου (for he will save his people) — rell

Matthew 1:22

δια Ησαιου του προφητου (through Isaiah the prophet) – D 269 954 it^{a,b,c,d} vg^{mss} syr^{s,h,pal} cop^{sa^{ms}} arm Diatessaron^{syr} Irenaeus^{lat}
δια στοματος Ησαιου του προφητου (through the mouth of Isaiah the prophet) – syr^{c}
δια του προφητου (through the prophet) – rell

Matthew 1:23

καλεσεις το ονομα (you^{sg} will call his name) – D^{*,2} it^{d^{(c)},ff^{1}} cop^{bo^{mss}} Origen Eusebius
καλεσει το ονομα (he will call his name) – it^{d*}
καλεσουσιν το ονομα (they will call his name) – rell

Matthew 1:24

ἐγερθεὶς (woke) – א B C* Z 071 ƒ^{1}
διεγερθεὶς (was awakened) – C^{3} D L W 087 ƒ^{13} 33 𝔐/Byz

Matthew 1:25

ουκ εγινωσκεν αυτην εως ου (was not knowing her until which [time]) – omitted by it^{k} syr^{s}

Matthew 1:25

υιον (a son) – א B Z^{vid} 071^{vid} ƒ^{1} ƒ^{13^{pt}} 33 1192 it^{b,c,g^{1},k} syr^{c,pal^{mss}} mae-1 geo Ambrose Chromatius
αυτω υιον (to him a son) – syr^{s}
τον υιον (the son) – cop^{bo}
υιον αυτης (her son) – 1182 cop^{sa}
τον υιον τον πρωτοτοκον (the firstborn son) — D* L it^{d,q}
τον υιον αυτης τον πρωτοτοκον (her firstborn son) — rell

14 Textual variants in Matthew 2

Matthew 2:3

πασα (everyone) — omitted by D

Matthew 2:4

παρ' αυτων (close to them) — omitted by D Γ

Matthew 2:5

per Esiam prophetam dicentum (through Isaiah the prophet who related) — it^{a}
δια του προφητου Μιχαιου (through the prophet Micah) — 4 cop^{bo^{ms}}
δια του προφητου (through the prophet) – rell

Matthew 2:9

επανω (over) — omitted by syr^{s} Origen

Matthew 2:9

του παιδιου (of the child) — D it
ου ην το παιδιον (where the child was) — rell

Matthew 2:11

ευρον (they found) — 2^{c}, 474, it^{aur,b,c,ff^{1},g^{1}} vg
ειδον (they saw) — rell

Matthew 2:11

τας πηρας (their bag) — Epiphanius
τους θησαυρους (their treasures) — rell

Matthew 2:12

εις την χωραν αυτων (into their country) – Β
εις την εαυτων χωραν (into their own country) – א f^{1} 157 a b g^{1} vg cop

Matthew 2:13

κατ οναρ εφανη – Β 372 cop^{sa}
φαινεται κατ οναρ (appeared in a dream) – א

Matthew 2:15

του στοματος Ησαιου του προφητου (the mouth of Isaiah the prophet) — syr^{s}
του προφητου (the prophet) — rell

Matthew 2:17

ρηθεν υπο Κυριου δια Ιερεμιου (spoken by the LORD through Jeremiah) — D it^{aur}

Matthew 2:18

κλαυθμὸς (weeping) — א, B, Z, Z, 0250, ƒ^{1}, 22 279 372 1491 ℓ^{2211} lat syr^{p,pal} cop^{sa,mae} eth Justin Hilary Jerome Augustine Hesychius
θρηνος (lamentation) — cop^{bo}
θρῆνος καὶ κλαυθμός (lamentation and weeping) — C D E K L W Δ Π Σ 0233 ƒ^{13}, most minuscules 𝔐/Byz, ℓ 70, ℓ 150, ℓ 185, ℓ 1761, it^{(d)} syr^{s,c,h} arm eth geo slav Origen Proclus

Matthew 2:18

βρυγμος (gnashing) — Z
οδυρμος (wailing) — rell

Matthew 2:21

ηλθεν (came) – D L W 0233 0250 ƒ^{1} ƒ^{13} 33 cop^{pt} 𝔐
εισηλθεν (entered) – א B C cop^{pt}
επανηλθεν (was returning) – cop^{pt} Eusebius

11 Textual variants in Matthew 3

Matthew 3:3

φωνη βοωντος εν τη ερημω (A voice shouting in the wild) – omitted by syr^{s}

Matthew 3:3

ευθειας ποιειτε τας τριβους αυτου (Make his paths straight) – omitted by it^{k} syr^{s}

Matthew 3:3 (see Isaiah 40:3)

του Θεου ημων (of our God) – it^{b} syr^{c} Irenaeus
omitted (see previous variant) – it^{k} syr^{s}
αυτου – rell

Matthew 3:5

παιδια Ιεροσολυμα (the children of Jerusalem) – syr^{s,c}
τα Ιεροσολυμα (the Jerusalemites) – 157 1071^{c}
πασα Ιεροσολυμα (all Jerusalem) – 517 892 1424
πασα η Ιεροσολυμα (all of Jerusalem) – ƒ^{1} 22 1365 it^{a,k,l} vg^{ms} arm Origen
Ιεροσολυμα (Jerusalem) – rell

Matthew 3:6

εις τον Ιορδανην (into the Jordan) – 983 1689
εν τω Ιορδανη (in the Jordan) – C^{3} D K L Π ƒ^{13} 28 700 892 𝔐 lat mae-1
εν τω Ιορδανη ποταμω (in the Jordan River) – א B C* M S W Δ 0233 ƒ^{1} 22 33 157 346 579 1424 it^{q} syr cop arm Origen

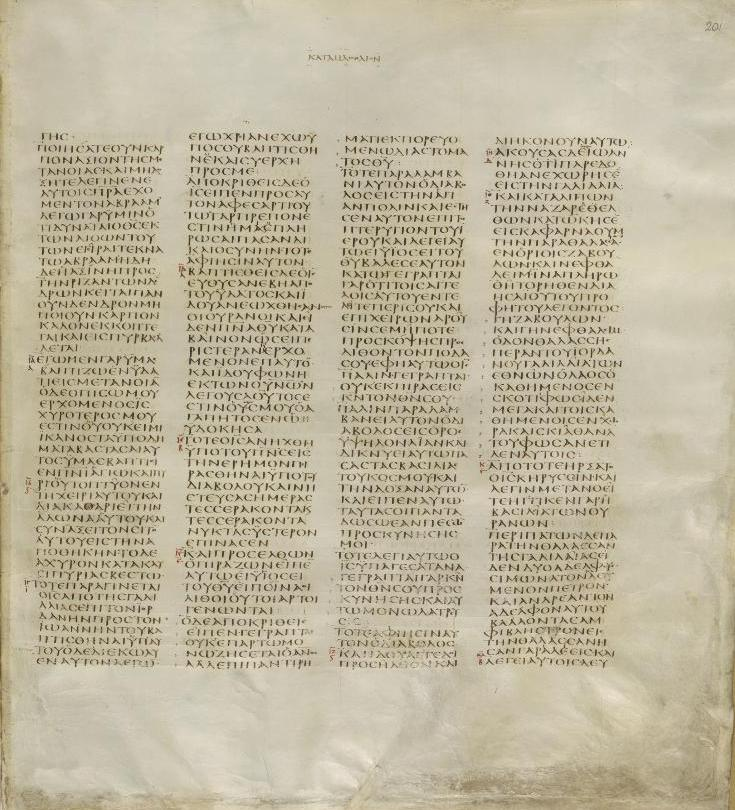
Sinaiticus, Matthew 3:7-4:19

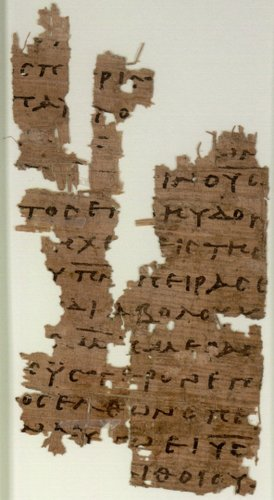
Matt 3:10-12 from Papyrus 101

Matthew 3:9

εν εαυτοις (in yourselves) – omitted by it^{mss} syr^{s} Chrysostom

Matthew 3:11

οπισω μου (behind me) – omitted by 𝔓^{101} it^{a,d} cop^{sa^{mss}} Cyprian

Matthew 3:11

και πυρι (and fire) – omitted by E S V Ω 2 28 517 579 1424 𝔐 syr^{pal}

Matthew 3:14

Ιωαννης (John) – omitted by א* B 𝑙^{1043} cop^{sa} Eusebius

Matthew 3:15

τοτε αφιησιν αυτον βαπτισθηναι (Then he permitted him to be baptized.) — syr^{s,c}
[τοτε αφιησιν αυτον] et cum baptizaretur lumen ingens circum fulsit de aqua, ita ut timerent omnes qui advenerant (Then he permitted him. And when he should be baptized, a prodigious light shone about from (down upon?) the water, so that all they who had come would fear.) — it^{a}
[τοτε αφιησιν αυτον] et cum baptizaretur Iesus lumen magnum fulgebat de aqua, ita ut timerant omnes qui congregati erant (Then he permitted him. And when Jesus should be baptized, a great light was shining from (down upon?) the water, so that all they who were gathered together would fear.) — it^{g^{1}}
και πυρ ανηφθη εν τω Ιορδανη (And fire was kindled in the Jordan.) — Justin Martyr
...the light that appeared on the water [of the Jordan]... — Diatessaron^{Tatian} (per Ephrem)
και ευθυς περιελαμψε τον τοπον φως μεγα (And immediately a great light illuminated that place) — Gospel^{Heb} (per Epiphanius)
τοτε αφιησιν αυτον (Then he permitted him.) — rell

Matthew 3:17

λεγουσα προς αυτον Συ ει ο υιος μου (saying to him, "You are my son") – D it^{a,d} syr^{s,c,pal} Irenaeus
λεγουσα Ουτος εστιν ο υιος μου (saying, "This is my son") – rell

18 Textual variants in Matthew 4

Matthew 4:2

και νυκτας τεσσερακοντα (and forty nights) – omitted by ƒ^{1} syr^{c} Irenaeus

Matthew 4:4

εκπορευομενω δια στοματος (going out through the mouth) – omitted by D it^{a,b,d,g^{1}} Clement Tertullian Augustine

Matthew 4:6

βαλε σεαυτον εντευθεν κατω (Throw yourself down from here) – C* Θ syr^{s} cop^{bo}
βαλε σεαυτον κατω (Throw yourself down) – rell

Matthew 4:8

δικνυει (showed) – א
δεικνυσιν (showed) – Β
εδειξεν (showed) – D 372

Matthew 4:10

υπαγε (Go away!) – א B C*^{vid} K P S V W Δ Σ 0233 ƒ^{1} ƒ^{13} 22 372 565 579* 700 892* 1079 1546 2680 2737 𝑙^{253} it^{f,k,l^{(c)}} vg^{mss} syr^{p,h,pal} cop^{mss} geo^{mss} slav^{mss} Diatessaron^{arm} Ignatius Irenaeus^{pt} Tertullian Origen Hilary Chromatius Basil Jerome
vade retro (Go behind!) – it^{a, aur, c, ff^{1}, g^{1}} vg^{mss} Irenaeus^{arm}
υπαγε οπισω μου (Get behind me!) – C^{2} D E L Z 28 33 118^{supp} 157 180 205 209 597^{c} 892^{c} 1006 1009 1010 1071 1195 1216 1230 1241 1242 1243 1253 1292 1365 1424 1505 1582^{c} 1646 2148 2174 𝔐 𝑙^{76} it^{b,d,h,l*} vg^{ms} syr^{c} cop^{mss} arm eth geo^{mss} slav^{mss} Diatessaron^{syr} Justin Liber Graduum Athanasius Asterius Ephraem (Ambrose) Chrysostom (Augustine) Nestorius^{mss}
υπαγε οπισω σου (Get behind you or Get you behind) – syr^{s}

Matthew 4:12

ο Ιησους (Jesus) – omitted by א B C*^{vid} D Z 33 700 1010 1241 it^{ff^{1},k} syr^{s} cop Origen

Matthew 4:13

παραθαλασσαν (by the sea) – א W
παραθαλασσιαν (by the sea) – B
παραθαλασσιον (by the sea) – D 372

Matthew 4:17

μετανοειτε (Repent!) – omitted by it^{k} syr^{s,c} (Justin) Clement Origen^{mss} (Eusebius)

Matthew 4:18

Παραγων (while passing) – D it syr^{s} Eusebius
Περιπατων (while walking) – rell

Matthew 4:18

τον λεγομενον Πετρον (who is called Peter) – omitted by syr^{s}

Matthew 4:21-22

Both verses omitted – W 33

Matthew 4:23

ο Ιησους (Jesus) – omitted by B 𝑙^{20} 𝑙^{1043} it^{(k)} syr^{c} cop^{sa,mae-1}

Matthew 4:23

εν τη Γαλιλαια (in Galilee) – א
εν ολη τη Γαλιλαια (in all Galilee) – B C 157 cop syr eth
ολην την γαλιλαιαν (all Galilee) – D

4:23b

διδασκων αυτοις – א
διδασκων – Β

Matthew 4:24

πασαν την Συριαν (whole of Syria) – א 157
ολην την Συριαν (all Syria) – Β

Matthew 4:24

Και απηλθεν η ακοη αυτου εις ολην την Συριαν (And the report of him went forth into all of Syria) – omitted by syr^{s}

Matthew 4:24

δαιμονιζομενους και σεληνιαζομενους και παραλυτικους (those being possessed by demons, and those being moonstruck, and the paralytics) – omitted by syr^{s}

Matthew 4:24

και παντας εθεραπευσεν (and he tended to all) – D it syr^{s,c}
text omitted – it^{(k)}
και εθεραπευσεν αυτους (and he tended to them) – rell

36 Textual variants in Matthew 5

Matthew 5:4-5

Verses appear in reverse order (5-4) – D 17 33 130 it^{a,aur,c,d,ff^{1},g^{1},h,k,l} vg syr^{c} cop^{bo^{ms}} Diatessaron Clement Origen Eusebius Apostolic Canons Aphraates Hilary Ephraem Basil Gregory Ambrose Chrysostom^{pt} Jerome Augustine Theodoret^{pt}

Matthew 5:9

οτι υιοι – א C D 13-124-556
οτι αυτοι υιοι – B

Matthew 5:10

ενεκα – B
ενεκεν –א

Matthew 5:11

οταν οι ανθρωποι (whenever other men) – 0133 it^{aur*,(g^{1}),(q)} syr^{s,c}
οταν (whenever) – rell

Matthew 5:11

ρημα (statement) – omitted by א B D 𝑙^{1043} lat syr^{(s),c} cop Tertullian

Matthew 5:11

ψευδομενοι (while lying i.e. falsely) – omitted by D it^{b,c,d,g^{1},h,k} syr^{s} Tertullian Origen^{pt} Eusebius Hilary Lucifer Ambrose Chromatius^{pt} Augustine^{pt} Speculum

Matthew 5:11

ενεκεν του ονοματος μου (for the sake of my name) – syr^{s,c}
ενεκεν δικαιοσυνης (for the sake of righteousness) – D it^{mss}
ενεκεν εμου (for my sake) – rell

Matthew 5:12

τους προ υμων (who were before you) – omitted by syr^{s}

Matthew 5:18

παρελθη απο του νομου και των προφητων (pass away from the Law and the Prophets) – Θ Σ ƒ^{13} 565 1071 syr^{pal^{mss}} arm Irenaeus^{lat}
παρελθη απο του νομου (pass away from the Law) – rell

Matthew 5:18

εως παντα – B 106
εως αν παντα –א

Matthew 5:19

ος δ’ αν ποιηση και διδαξη ουτος μεγας κληθησεται εν τη βασιλεια των ουρανων (but whoever should do them and should teach them, the same will be called great in the kingdom of the heavens) – omitted by א* D W it^{d} cop^{bo^{ms}}

Matthew 5:20

Verse omitted – D it^{d} vg^{ms}

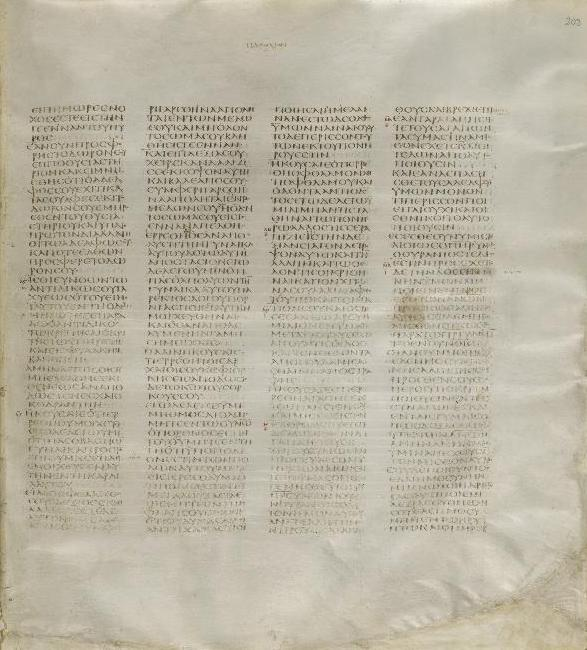
Sinaiticus, Matthew 5:22-6:4

Matthew 5:22

ραχα – א* D W
ρακα – Β

Matthew 5:22

οργιζομενος τω αδελφω αυτου (angry at his brother) – 𝔓^{64} א* B Ω 372 1292 1424^{mg} 2174^{vid} 2737 it^{aur} vg^{mss} eth^{mss} Gospel^{Naz} Ptolemy Justin Clement Tertullian^{vid} Origen Theodore Basil Chromatius Jerome Augustine^{pt} Cassian
οργιζομενος τω αδελφω αυτου εικη (angry at his brother without cause) – א^{2} D E K L W Δ Θ Π Σ 0233 0287 ƒ^{1} ƒ^{13}, most minuscules, 𝔐 Lect it vg^{mss} syr cop goth arm eth^{mss} geo slav Diatessaron Irenaeus Origen^{mss} Cyprian Eusebius Hilary Lucifer Basil Apostolic Constitutions Chrysostom Augustine^{pt} Cyril Jerome^{mss} Speculum Theodoret Theodore of Mopsuestia

Matthew 5:25

ο κριτης (the judge) – 𝔓^{64}^{(vid)} א B 0275 ƒ^{1} ƒ^{13} 372 892 1216 1230 it^{k} syr^{pal} arm eth geo^{mss} Carpocrates Irenaeus^{lat} Clement Hilary Chrysostom Augustine
ο κριτης σε παραδωσει (the judge will hand you over) – D
ο κριτης σε παραδω (the judge should hand you over) – K L W Δ Θ Π 0233 22 28 33 565 (700) 1009 1010 1071 1079 1195 1241 1242 1365 1546 1646 2148 2174 𝔐 Lect lat syr^{c,p,h} cop goth geo^{mss} Jerome
text omitted – syr^{s}

Matthew 5:27

ερρεθη τοις αρχαιοις (it was told to the ancients) – L Δ Θ 0233 ƒ^{13} 33 579 892 1010 𝔐^{mss} vg^{mss} syr^{c} Irenaeus^{lat} Origen^{lat} Eusebius^{pt} Cyril
ερρεθη (it was told) – rell

Matthew 5:28

επιθυημσαι – א 236
επιθυμησαι αυτην – Β W
επιθυμησαι αυτης – א M Σ

Matthew 5:28

εαυτου – Β
αυτου – א

Matthew 5:29

απελθη εις γεενναν (should depart into Gehenna) – D 700^{mg} it^{mss} syr^{s,c} cop^{bo,(mae)}
βληθη εις γεενναν (should be cast into Gehenna) – rell

Matthew 5:30

Verse omitted – D it^{d} vg^{ms} syr^{s} cop^{bo^{ms}}

Matthew 5:30

εις γεενναν απελθη (into Gehenna he should depart) – א B ƒ^{1} 22 33 157 517^{supp} 892 lat syr^{c} cop^{bo,(mae)}
βληθησει εις την γεενναν (will be cast into the Gehenna) – L
βληθη εις γεενναν (should be cast into Gehenna) – W Δ Θ 0233 ƒ^{13} 𝔐 it^{f} vg^{ms} syr^{p,h} cop^{sa} goth Basil

Matthew 5:31

ερρεθη – א* Κ Π syr cop^{bo}
ερρεθη δε – B

Matthew 5:32

και ος εαν απολελυμενην γαμηση μοιχαται (and whoever should marry her who has been divorced, they commit adultery) – א^{(*),c} E K (L) W Δ (Θ) Π Σ 0250 ƒ^{1} ƒ^{13} 22 28 33 157 180 205 565 (579) 597 700 892 1006 1009 1010 1071 1079 1195 (1216) 1230 (1241) 1242 1243 1292 1342 1365 1424 1505 1646 (2148) 2174 𝔐 Lect it^{h} syr^{h} cop^{bo,mae} goth arm eth^{mss} Basil Chrysostom
και ο απολελυμενην γαμησας μοιχαται (and the one who should marry her who has been divorced, they commit adultery) – B (828) (𝑙^{184}) 𝑙^{185} 𝑙^{1579} lat syr cop^{sa} (geo) slav Origen
και ος απολελυμενην μοιχαται (and he who ... her who has been divorced, they commit adultery) – 1546
text omitted – D 64 it^{a,b,d,k} Origen^{mss} Zeno Chromatius Augustine^{pt} Augustine^{mss} Speculum

Matthew 5:33

τοις αρχαιοις (to the ancients) – omitted by it^{k} syr^{s} Irenaeus^{lat}

Matthew 5:37

εσται – Β Σ 61 68 245 700
εστω – א

Matthew 5:39

εις την δεξιαν σιαγονα – א W Σ 157 892
σιαγονα σου – B D
σου σιαγονα – E

Matthew 5:39

δεξιαν (right) – omitted by D it^{d,k} syr^{s,c}

Matthew 5:41

αγγαρευει – D
αγγαρευσει – B L M S U Π
αγγαρευση – א E G K V Δ Σ
και ος λεγει σοι – syr^{cur}

Matthew 5:42

αιτουντι σοι – א* y
αιτουντι σε – B

Matthew 5:44

ευλογειτε τους καταρωμενους υμας καλως ποιειτε τοις μισουσιν υμας (bless those who curse you, do good to those who hate you) – D^{(*),c} E K L W Δ Θ Π Σ 047 ƒ^{13} 28 33 118^{supp} 157 180 565 579 597 700 892 1006 1009 1010 1079 1185 1195 1216 1241 1242^{c} 1243 1292 1342 1365 1424 1505 1546 1646 2148 2174 𝔐 Lect^{mss} it^{c,d,f,h} syr^{(p),h,(pal)} mae-1 goth arm^{mss} eth^{mss} geo^{mss} slav Aphraates (Lucifer) Apostolic Constitutions (Chrysostom) (Speculum)
ευλογειτε τους καταρωμενους υμας (bless those who curse you) – 1071 𝑙^{866} 𝑙^{871} 𝑙^{1016} cop^{bo^{mss}} geo^{mss} (Athenagoras) Clement Tertullian Eusebius^{pt} (Theodoret) Cassiodorus
καλως ποιειτε τοις μισουσιν (do good to those hating you) – 1230 1242* lat arm^{mss} Eusebius^{pt} Ambrose Chromatius Jerome Augustine Arsenius
Text omitted – א B ƒ^{1} 22 205 279 660* 1192 2786* it^{k} syr^{s,c} cop^{sa,bo^{mss}} Codex Schøyen Theophilus Irenaeus^{lat} Origen Cyprian Adamantius Faustus

Matthew 5:44

επηρεαζοντων υμας (insultingly mistreat you) – omitted by א B ƒ^{1} 205 it^{k} syr^{s,c} cop^{sa,bo^{mss}} eth^{mss} Athenagoras Theophilus Irenaeus^{lat} Tertullian Origen Cyprian (Adamantius) Faustus Lucifer Jerome^{pt} Augustine (Speculum)

Matthew 5:45

και βρεχει επι δικαιους και αδικους – B
omit – א

Matthew 5:46

ουχι – B
οmit – א* cop^{bo} syr^{cur}

Matthew 5:47

Verse omitted – it^{k} syr^{s}

Matthew 5:47

φιλους (loved ones) – L W Δ Θ 28 33 𝔐 it^{f,h} syr^{h} goth Basil
αδελφους (brethren) – א B D Z ƒ^{1} ƒ^{13} 22 372 472 892 lat syr^{c,p} cop Cyprian
ασπαζομενους υμας (those who greet you) – 1424

Matthew 5:47

εθνικοι (Gentiles) – א B D Z Δ ƒ^{1} 22 33 174 (205) 279 372 892 1071 1216 1230 1241 1365 1424 2680 2786 lat syr^{s,c,h,pal} cop eth geo^{mss} Cyprian (Lucifer) Basil Chromatius Augustine
τελωναι (tax collectors) – E K L W Δ Θ Π Σ ƒ^{13} 28 157 180 565 579 597 700 1006 1009 1010 1079 1195 1242 1243 1292 1342 1505 1546 1646 2148 2174 𝔐 Lect it^{h} syr^{p} goth geo^{mss} slav
τελωναι και οι αμαρτωλοι (tax collectors and the sinful people) – arm

34 Textual variants in Matthew 6

Matthew 6:1

δικαιοσυνην (your righteousness) – א^{*,2} B D 0250 ƒ^{1} 372 892 1424* Lat syr^{s,pal} Origen
δοσιν (your giving) – א^{1} syr^{c} cop^{sa^{mss},bo}
δοσεις (your gifts) – Diatessaron^{syr}
ελεημοσυνην (your alms-giving) – L W Z Δ Θ ƒ^{13} 22 28 33 𝔐 it^{f,k} syr^{p,h} cop^{mae-1} arm goth Clement Origen^{mss} Didymus Basil

Matthew 6:2

αμην αμην (amen, amen) – א 13
αμην (amen) – B

Matthew 6:4

αποδωσει σοι (he will recompense you) – א B D Z ƒ^{1} ƒ^{13^{pt}} 22 33 205 983 1192 1292 1689 2786 it^{aur,d,ff^{1},k} vg syr^{c} cop Diatessaron^{syr} Origen Cyprian Chromatius Jerome Augustine
αποδωσει σοι εν τω φανερω (he will recompense you in the open) – E K L W Δ Θ Π Σ 0250 ƒ^{13^{pt}} 13 28 157 (168) 180 565 579 597 (700) 828 892 1006 1009 1010 1071 1079 1195 1216 1230 1241 1242 1243 1342 1365 1424 1505 1546 1646 2148 2174 𝔐 Lect it^{a,b,c,f,g^{1},h,l,q} syr^{s,p,h,pal} arm goth eth geo slav Diatessaron^{arm} Basil Nilus Chrysostom Speculum

Matthew 6:5

Verse omitted – syr^{s}

Matthew 6:6

προσευξαι τω πατρι σου εν τω κρυπτω (pray to your Father in secret) – D ƒ^{1} ƒ^{13} 700 it^{mss} vg^{mss} syr^{s,c} cop^{bo^{mss}}
προσευξαι τω πατρι σου τω εν τω κρυπτω (pray to your Father who is in secret) – rell

Matthew 6:6

αποδωσει σοι (he will recompense you) – א B D Z ƒ^{1} 22 205 1192 2786* it^{aur,d,ff^{1},k} vg syr^{s,c,pal^{mss}} cop Diatessaron^{syr} Origen Eusebius (Pseudo-Clementine) Hilary Ambrose Chromatius Augustine
αποδωσει σοι εν τω φανερω (he will recompense you in the open) – E G K L W X Δ Θ Π Σ ƒ^{13} 28 33 157 180 565 579 597 700 892 1006 1009 1010 1071 1079 1195 1216 1230 1241 1242 1243 1292 1342 1365 1424 1505 1546 1646 2148 2174 𝔐 Lect it^{a,b,c,f,g^{1},h,l,π,q} syr^{p,h,pal^{mss}} arm goth eth geo slav Diatessaron^{arm} Chrysostom Cyril

Matthew 6:7

υποκριται (hypocrites) – B 1424 syr^{c} cop^{mae}
εθνικοι (Gentiles) – rell

Matthew 6:8

ο πατηρ υμων ο ουρανιος (your heavenly father) – 047 28 892^{mg} 1195 1216 1424 1505 syr^{h} eth geo^{mss} Basil^{pt}
ο θεος ο πατηρ υμων (your God the Father) – א^{1} B cop^{sa,mae-1} Origen^{pt}
ο πατηρ ο ουρανιος (the heavenly father) – Origen^{pt}
ο πατηρ ημων (our father) – ƒ^{1} 205 1253 1546 𝑙^{76} 𝑙^{184} 𝑙^{387} 𝑙^{859} 𝑙^{1074} 𝑙^{1663}
ημων ο εν τοις ουρανιος (our one in the heavenly) – 2148
ο πατηρ υμων (your father) – א* D E G K L W Z Δ Θ Π Σ 0170^{vid} ƒ^{13} 22 33 157 180 565 579 597 700 892* 1006 1009 1010 1071 1079 1230 1241 1242 1243 1292 1342 1365 1646 2174 𝔐 Lect^{mss} latt syr^{s,c,p,pal} cop^{bo,fay} arm goth geo^{mss} slav Diatessaron^{syr} Origen^{pt} Basil^{pt} Ambrose Ambrosiaster Chromatius Jerome Augustine
Text omitted – Codex Schøyen

Matthew 6:8

ανοιξε το στομα (open your mouth) – D it^{h}
αιτησαι αυτον (ask him) – rell

Matthew 6:9

τω ουρανω (the heaven) – cop^{mae} Didache
τοις ουρανοις (the heavens) – rell

Matthew 6:11

ελθειν (to come) – cop^{sa}
τον επαυριον (of tomorrow) – cop^{bo,mae} Gospel^{Heb} (per Jerome)
αναγκαιον (necessary) – syr^{p,h}
διαρκης (lasting or continual) – syr^{c}
supersubstantialem (supersubstantial) – vg
cottidianum (quotidian) – it vg^{mss}
επιουσιον (superessential) – rell

Matthew 6:12

την οφειλην (my obligation) – Didache
τα παραπτωμα (our transgressions) – Origen
τα οφειληματα (debts) – rell

Matthew 6:13 (see 1 Chronicles 29:11–13)

οτι σου εστιν η βασιλλεια και η δυναμις και η δοξα εις τους αιωνας. αμην (Because yours is the kingdom and the power and the glory into the ages. Amen.) – E G K L W Δ Θ Π Σ 0233 ƒ^{13} 22 28 33 180 565 579 597 700 892 1006 1009 1010 1071 1079 1195 1216 1230 1241 1242 1243 1292 1365 1424 1505 1546 1646 (2148) 2174 𝔐 Lect it^{f,(g^{1}),(q)} syr^{(p),h,pal} cop^{bo^{mss}} arm goth eth geo slav Diatessaron^{arm} Apostolic Constitutions Chrysostom
οτι σου εστιν η βασιλλεια και η δυναμις και η δοξα του πατρος και του υιου και του αγιου πνευματος εις τους αιωνας. αμην (Because yours is the kingdom and the power and the glory of the Father and of the Son and of the Holy Spirit into the ages. Amen.) – 157 225 418
οτι σου εστιν η βασιλλεια του πατρος και του υιου και του αγιου πνευματος εις τους αιωνας. αμην (Because yours is the kingdom of the Father and of the Son and of the Holy Spirit into the ages. Amen.) – 1253
quoniam est tibi virtus in saecula saeculorum (Since to you is the power in the ages of ages) – it^{k}
οτι σου εστιν η δυναμις και η δοξα εις τους αιωνας. αμην (Because yours is the power and the glory into the ages. Amen.) – cop^{sa,fay} (Didache)
οτι σου εστιν η βασιλλεια και η δοξα εις τους αιωνας. αμην (Because yours is the kingdom and the glory into the ages. Amen.) – 1342 syr^{c}
οτι σου εστιν η βασιλλεια και η δυναμις εις τους αιωνας. αμην (Because yours is the kingdom and the power into the ages. Amen.) – 𝑙^{1016}
Text omitted – א B D Z 0170 ƒ^{1} (17) 130 205 372 890 1090^{c} 2701^{supp} 2737 2780* 2786 𝑙^{547} lat cop^{bo^{mss},mae} Diatessaron^{syr} Acta Thomae Tertullian Origen Cyprian Hilary (Cyril) Caesarius Gregory Ambrose Ambrosiaster Chromatius Jerome Augustine Cyril Maximus

Matthew 6:14

ο ουρανοις τα παραπτωματα υμων (the heavens your transgressions) – L ƒ^{13} 𝑙^{844} lat cop Didymus
ο εν τοις ουρανοις (who is in the heavens) – Θ 700 it
ο ουρανιος (the heavenly) – rell

Matthew 6:15

τα παραπτωματα αυτων (their transgressions) – omitted by א D ƒ^{1} 1 22 118 130 205 209 279 372 892* 1357* 1582* 2701^{supp} 2737 2786 lat syr^{p} cop^{bo^{mss},fay,mae-1} Diatessaron Eusebius Augustine

Matthew 6:16

και οταν δε – א syr^{cur} eth
οταν δε – Β

Matthew 6:16

υποκριται – א
οι υποκριται – Β

το προσωπον – 244 א g^{1} k syr^{p}
τα προσωπα – B

αμην γαρ – א, cop^{bo}
αμην – Β

Matthew 6:18a

νηστευων τοις ανθροποις – Β
τοις ανθρωποις νηστευων –א

6:18b

σου – א Δ syr^{cur}
omit – Β

Matthew 6:18

αποδωσει σοι (he will recompense you) – א B D G K L W Θ Π Σ 0250 ƒ^{1} ƒ^{13} 28 33 180 565 597 700 892 1006 1010 1079 1242 1292 1365 1424 1646 𝔐^{pt} Lect^{pt} it^{aur,f,ff^{1},l,q} vg syr cop goth arm^{mss} Theophilus Euthalius Petrus
αποδωσει υμιν (he will recompense you all) – Ambrose Chromatius Augustine Speculum
αποδωσει υμιν εν τω φανερω (he will recompense you all in the open) – it^{a,b,c,g^{1},h,k} eth^{ms}
αποδωσει σοι εν τω φανερω (he will recompense you in the open) – E Δ 0233 157 205 209 579 1009 1071 1195 1216 1230 1241 1243 1253 1342 1505 1546 2174 𝔐^{pt} Lect^{pt} arm^{mss} eth^{mss} geo slav Diatessaron^{arm} Ephraem

Matthew 6:20

και κλεπτουσιν (and steal) – א ƒ^{1} 𝑙^{844} it^{mss} syr^{c}
Text omitted – W it^{k}
ουδε κλεπτουσιν (nor steal) – rell

Matthew 6:21

εκει εσται η καρδια – B cop^{bo}
ουδε κλεπτουσιν – Β syr^{p}

Matthew 6:22

ο οφθαλμος σου – Β
ο οφθαλμος –א

6:22b

εαν ουν – B
εαν –א

Matthew 6:23

εαν δε ο οφθαλμος σου πονηρος – א W 33
εαν δε ο οφθαλμος σου πονηρος η – B cop it
εαν δε ο οφθαλμος σου η πονηρος – syr

Matthew 6:24

Ουδεις οικετης δυναται (Not one servant is able) — L Δ 1241
Ουδεις δυναται (No one is able) — rell

Matthew 6:25

η τι πιητε (or what you^{pl} should drink) – B W Φ ƒ^{13} 22^{mg} 33 157 205 1230 1342 𝑙^{547} it^{aur,c,f,g^{1},h,m,q} cop^{sa^{mss},bo,mae-1} arm^{mss} geo^{mss} slav Origen (Eusebius) Athanasius Basil^{pt} Evagrius Jerome^{mss} Nilus Marcus Speculum Maximus
και τι πιητε (and what you^{pl} should drink) – E G K (L) N Δ Θ Π Σ 0233 (28) 180 565 579 597 700 1006 1009 1010 (1071) 1079 1195 1216 1241 1242 1243 1253 1292 1365 1424 1505 1546 1646 (2148) 2174 𝔐 Lect syr^{p,h} goth geo^{mss} Basil^{pt} Augustine^{pt}
Text omitted – א ƒ^{1} 22* 372 892 1592 it^{a,b,ff^{1},k,l} vg syr^{c,pal} cop^{sa^{mss},mae-2} arm^{mss} eth^{mss} Diatessaron^{syr} Justin Clement Methodius Origen Adamantius Hilary Athanasius Epiphanius Chrysostom Jerome Augustine^{pt} Cyril

6:25b

υμων – B
omit – א b

Matthew 6:27

μεριμνων (worrying) — omitted by 1293 it^{mss} syr^{c}

Matthew 6:28

αυξανουσιν ου κοπιωσιν ουδε νηθουσιν (they are growing; they are not laboring, nor are they spinning) — א^{c} (B) ƒ^{1} (33) 205 (1071) latt syr^{p,h,pal} cop eth geo slav Hilary Athanasius Chrysostom^{pt} Augustine Speculum
αυξανουσιν ου νιθουσιν ουδε κοπιωσιν (they are growing; they are not spinning, nor are they laboring) — Θ syr^{c}
αυξανει ου κοπια ουδε νηθει (it is growing; it is not laboring, nor is it spinning) — E G K L N W Δ Π Σ 0233 0281 ƒ^{13} 28 157 180 565 579 597 700 892 1006 1010 1079 1195 1216 1230 1241 1242 1243 1253 1292 1342 1365 1424 1505 1546 2148 2174 𝔐 Lect goth (arm) Basil Chrysostom^{pt} Nilus
ου ξενουσιν ουδε νηθουσιν ουδε κοπιωσιν (they do not card, nor do they spin, nor do they labor) — א*
ου ξαινει ουδε νηθει (it is not carding, nor is it spinning) — P.Oxy.655
αυξανει και ουδε νηθει (it is growing, but it is neither spinning) — 1646
αυξανεν (it is growing) — 1009

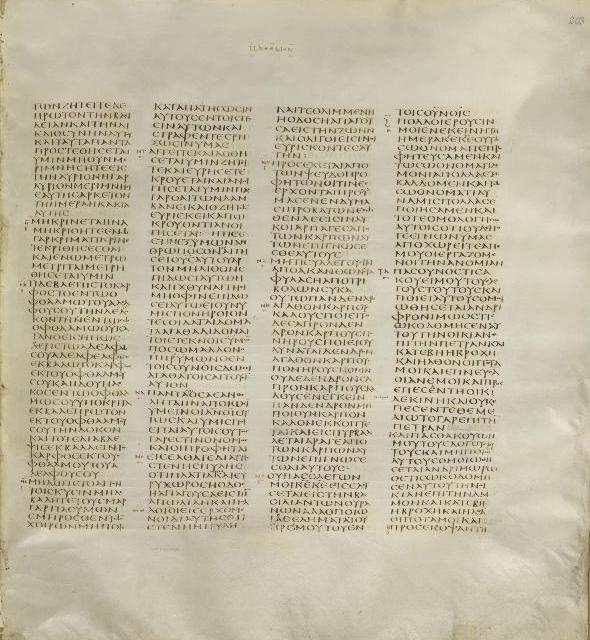
Sinaiticus, Matthew 6:32-7:27

Matthew 6:32

ταυτα γαρ παντα – א N Δ Σ f^{13} 157 892
παντα γαρ ταυτα – B
παντα – a b k

6:32b

ο θεος ο πατηρ υμων – א
ο πατηρ υμων – א^{2} 28 237
ο πατηρ υμων ο ουρανιος – B 050

6:32c

χρητε – B
χρηζετε –א

Matthew 6:33

την βασιλειαν (the kingdom) — א B 57 345 440 817 995 1646 it^{(k),l} vg^{mss} cop eth^{mss} Tertullian Cyprian (Eusebius) Aphraates (Gregory) Didymus^{pt} Macarius Augustine^{pt} Speculum
την βασιλειαν των ουρανων (the kingdom of the heavens) — 301* 366 373 726 1272* 1590* 𝑙^{858} Justin Clement^{pt} Ephraem^{pt} Chrysostom^{pt}
την βασιλειαν του θεου (the kingdom of God) — E G K L N W Δ Θ Π Σ Φ 0233 ƒ^{1} ƒ^{13} 22 28 33 119 157 180 205 245 482 565 579 597 700 892 1006 1009 1010 1071 1079 1195 1216 1230 1241 1242 1243 1253 1292 1342 1365 1392 1424 1505 1546 2148 2174 𝔐 Lect lat syr cop^{mae-1} arm eth^{mss} geo slav Diatessaron^{syr} Clement^{pt} Serapion (Hilary) Basil Didymus^{pt} Evagrius Chrysostom^{pt} Chromatius Jerome Marcus Eremita Augustine^{pt} Cyril Theodoret John

23 Textual variants in Matthew 7

Matthew 7:3

την δε δοκον την εν τω οφθαλμω – א N Σ 235
την δε εν τω σω οφθαλμω δοκον – Β 050

Matthew 7:4a

λεγεις – א 700 0233
ερεις – Β

7:4b

τω αδελφω σου αδελφε – א
τω αδελφω σου – Β

Matthew 7:8

ανοιγεται – Β
ανοιγησεται –א

Matthew 7:9

η τις – Β Ζ
η τις εστιν –א

Matthew 7:12

παντα οσα – א
παντα ουν – B
παντα δε – cop^{bo}

Matthew 7:13

η πυλη (the gate) — omitted by א* 1646 ℓ^{211} it^{a,b,c,h,k} vg^{mss} Clement Hippolytus Origen^{pt} Cyprian Eusebius Didymus^{pt} Augustine^{pt} Speculum

Matthew 7:14

η πυλη (the gate) — omitted by 113 182* 482 544 it^{a,(h),k} Diatessaron Clement Tertullian Origen^{pt} Cyprian Eusebius Aphraates Gregory Gregory Jerome Nilus Augustine Hesychius Speculum

Matthew 7:17

καρπους ποιει καλους – Β cop
καλους ποιει καρπους – Δ δ
καρπους καλους ποιει –א

Matthew 7:18

ποιειν – א
ενεγκειν – B

Matthew 7:21

ουρανοις αυτος εισελευσεται εις την βασιλειαν των ουρανων (in the heavens, he will enter into the kingdom of the heavens) – C^{(2)} W Θ Φ (33) 713 1071 1241 vg syr^{c} Cyprian Theodoret
ουρανοις (in the heavens) – rell

Matthew 7:22

δαιμονια πολλα – א
δαιμονια – B

Matthew 7:22

κυριε κυριε ου τω ονοματι σου εφαγομεν και επιομεν και ου τω σω ονοματι επροφητευσαμεν (Lord, lord, did we not eat and drink in your name? And did we not prophesy in your name?) – syr^{c} Justin (Origen)
κυριε κυριε ου τω σω ονοματι επροφητευσαμεν (Lord, lord, did we not prophesy in your name?) – rell

Matthew 7:23

απ’ εμου παντες (away from me, all of you) – L Θ ƒ^{13} 1424 it^{b} vg^{mss}
απ’ εμου (away from me) – rell

Matthew 7:24

ομοιωθησεται (he will be likened) – א B Z Θ 0281 ƒ^{(1)} ƒ^{13} 33 205 700 892 1071 1241 1365 𝑙^{844} 𝑙^{866} it^{a,aur,b,c,ff^{1},g^{1},l} vg syr^{p,h^{mg},pal^{mss}} cop^{sa,mae} arm eth geo Diatessaron Origen Basil Ambrose Didymus Chrysostom Jerome Augustine^{pt} Cyril
ομοιωσω αυτον (I will liken him) – C E G K L W X Δ Π Σ 157 180 565 579 597 1006 1009 1010 1079 1195 1216 1230 1242 1243 1253 1292 1342 1424 1505 1546 1646 2148 2174 𝔐 Lect it^{f,h,k,q} syr^{c,h,pal^{ms}} cop^{bo} goth slav Cyprian Hilary Lucifer Augustine^{pt} Speculum

Matthew 7:25

ελθαν – B
ελθον –א

Matthew 7:27

ελθαν – B
ελθον –א

7:27b

και επνευσαν οι ανεμοι – Β
omit –א

Matthew 7:27

επνευσαν οι ανεμοι και (the winds blew and) – omitted by א*

Matthew 7:27

μεγαλη σφοδρα (exceedingly great) – Θ Σ ƒ^{13} 33 713 1241^{c} cop^{mae-1} syr^{pal^{mss}} Basil
μεγαλη (great) – rell

Matthew 7:28

παντες (everyone) – 998 Eusebius
παντες οι οχλοι (all of the multitudes or everyone who had crowded around) – Δ Θ ƒ^{1} 22 vg^{ms} syr^{pal^{mss}} Origen
οι οχλοι (the multitudes) – rell

Matthew 7:28

επι τη διδαχη αυτου οι οχλοι – א
οι οχλοι επι τη διδαχη αυτου – Β

Matthew 7:29

και ουχ ως οι γραμματεις (and not as the scribes) — C* L M X 565 700 1424 𝔐 it^{f} syr^{c} goth
και ουχ ως οι γραμματεις αυτων (and not as their scribes) – א B K Π Δ Θ ƒ^{1} ƒ^{13} 22 372 579 892 1365 vg^{mss} cop
και ουχ ως οι γραμματεις αυτων και οι Φαρισαιοι (and not as their scribes and the Pharisees) – C^{2} W 33 1241 lat syr geo^{mss} Eusebius^{pt}

40 Textual variants in Matthew 8

Matthew 8:1

καταβαντος δε αυτου – B C W א^{b}
και καταβαντος αυτου – Z
καταβαντι δε αυτω –א*

Matthew 8:3

ο Ιησους (Jesus) – omitted by א B C* ƒ^{1} ƒ^{13} 33 892 it^{k} cop^{sa^{mss},bo} Cyprian

8:3a

την χειρα αυτου – א 124
την χειρα – B

8:3b

ευθεως – B
omit – א

8:4a

ειπεν – א k cop
λεγει – Β

8:4b

προσενεγκον – B C
προσενεγκε –א

Matthew 8:5

εισελθοντος δε αυτου εις Καφαρναουμ (But he was entering into Capernaum) – א B C* Z ƒ^{1} ƒ^{13} 33 700 1241 it^{aur,ff^{1},l} vg cop^{pt} Origen
εισελθοντι δε αυτω εις Καφαρναουμ (But when he was entering into Capernaum) – L W Θ 0233 𝔐 cop^{pt}
εισελθοντι τω Ιησου εις Καφαρναουμ (When Jesus was entering into Capernaum) – C^{3}
μετα δε ταυτα (But after these things) – it^{k} syr^{(s)}
μετα δε ταυτα εισελθοντος δε αυτου εις Καφαρναουμ (But after these things, then he [went] into Capernaum) – it^{a,b,c,f,g^{1},h,q} syr^{(c)}

Matthew 8:5

χιλιαρχος (chiliarch) – syr^{s,h^{mg}} Clement Eusebius^{pt}
εκατονταρχος (centurion) – rell

Matthew 8:6

κυριε (Lord) – omitted by א* it^{k} syr^{s,c} Origen Hilary

Matthew 8:7

ο Ιησους (Jesus) – omitted by א B 892 it^{k} syr^{s} cop^{bo^{mss}}

Matthew 8:7a

λεγει – Β 700
και λεγει –א

Matthew 8:7b

ακολουθει μοι εγω ελθων – א
εγω ελθων – Β

Matthew 8:8

χιλιαρχος (chiliarch) – syr^{s,h^{mg}} Clement Eusebius^{pt}
εκατονταρχος (centurion) – rell

Matthew 8:8

ο παις μου (my servant) – omitted by ƒ^{1} it^{k} cop^{sa,bo^{mss},mae-1} Origen

Matthew 8:9

υπο εξουσιαν τασσομενος (placed under authority) – א B 4 273 372 792 899* 995 1403 2236 2703 2737 𝑙^{211*} it^{a,aur,b,c,g^{1},h,k,q} vg^{mss} syr^{pal} cop^{pt} Diatessaron Hilary Chrysostom Augustine
υπο εξουσιαν (under authority) – C K L W X Δ Θ Π ƒ^{1} ƒ^{13} 33 565 700 892 1009 1010 1071 1079 1195 1216 1230 1242 1253 1365 1546 1646 2148 2174 𝔐 Lect it^{ff^{1},l} vg^{mss} syr^{(s),c,p,h} cop^{pt} arm (eth) geo Chrysostom
Text omitted – 1241

Matthew 8:10

παρ’ ουδενι τοσαυτην πιστιν εν τω Ισραηλ ευρον (I have otherwise found no one in Israel with so much faith) – B W (0281) 0287 4 (22) 273 335 697 (892) 1005 2586 2701^{supp} 2786 it^{a,(g^{1}),k,q} syr^{c,h^{mg},pal} cop^{sa,bo} eth^{ms} Diatessaron^{arm}
παρ’ ουδενι τοσαυτην πιστιν ευρον (I have otherwise found no one with so much faith) – ƒ^{1} 205
ουδε εν τω Ισραηλ τοσαυτην πιστιν ευρον (Not even in Israel have I found so much faith) – א C E G K L N X Δ Θ Π Σ Φ 0233 0250 ƒ^{13} 33 157 180 565 579 597 700 1006 1009 1010 1071 1079 1195 1216 1230 (1241) (1242) 1243 1253 1292 1342 (1365) 1424 1505 1546 1646 2148 2174 𝔐 Lect it^{aur,b,c,f,ff^{1},h,l} vg syr^{(s),p,h} cop^{mae} arm goth eth^{mss} geo slav Diatessaron^{syr} Origen^{lat} Hilary Chrysostom (Chromatius) Jerome Augustine

Matthew 8:11

εν τοις κολποις Αβρααμ και Ισαακ και Ιακωβ (in the bosoms of Abraham and Isaac and Jacob) – Clement Epiphanius
μετα Αβρααμ και Ισαακ και Ιακωβ (with Abraham and Isaac and Jacob) – rell

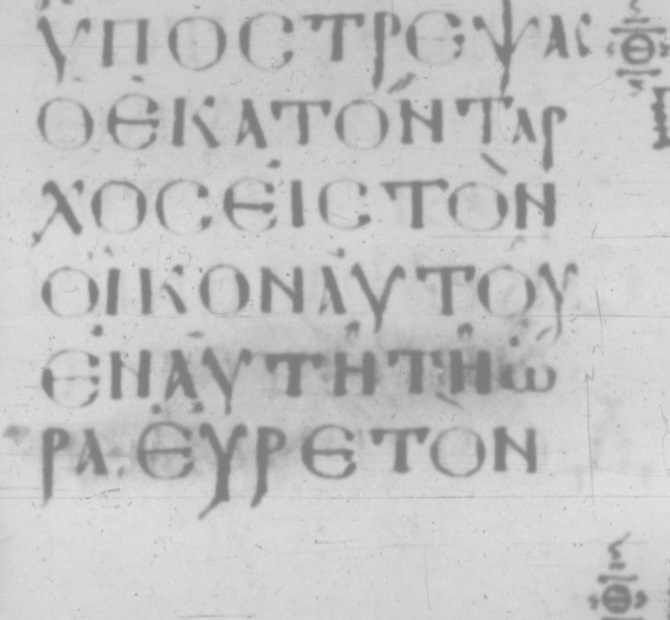
Matt 8:13 in Codex Nanianus

Matthew 8:12

εκβληθησονται (they will be cast out) – א^{1} B C K L W X Δ Θ Π ƒ^{1} ƒ^{13} 33 565 700 892 1009 1010 1071 1079 1195 1216 1230 1242 1253 1365 1546 1646 2174 𝔐 Lect it^{aur,f,ff^{1},l} vg syr^{h} cop goth eth geo^{mss} Cyprian^{pt} Didymus^{pt} Chrysostom
εμβληθησονται (they will be cast into) – 1241 2148
εξελευσονται (they will go forth) – א* 0250 it^{a,b,c,g^{1},h,(k),q} syr^{s,c,p,pal} arm Diatessaron Heracleon Irenaeus Origen Cyprian^{pt} Eusebius Didymus^{pt} Augustine
Text omitted – geo^{mss}

Matthew 8:13

χιλιαρχω (chiliarch) – syr^{s} Clement Eusebius^{pt}
εκατονταρχη (centurion) – rell

Matthew 8:13

εν τη ωρα εκεινη (in that hour) – א B K L X Π ƒ^{1} ƒ^{13} 565 (892) 1009 1071 1079 1195 1216 1230 1241 1242 1253 1365 1546 1646 2148 2174 𝔐 Lect it^{aur,f,ff^{1},k,l} vg^{mss} syr^{s,c,p,h} cop^{sa^{mss},bo^{mss}} goth eth
απο της ωρας εκεινης (from that hour) – C N Δ Θ 0250 33 1010 𝑙^{950} 𝑙^{1627} it^{a,b,c,g^{1},h,q} vg^{mss} syr^{pal} cop^{sa^{mss},bo^{mss}} Eusebius Basil Chrysostom Augustine
εν τη ημερα εκεινη (in that day) – W 700 1424 arm geo

Matthew 8:13 (see Luke 7:10)

Verse concludes with ωρα εκεινη [ωρας εκεινης: C N Θ 0250 33 it^{g^{1}} syr^{pal}] και υποστρεψας ο εκατονταρχος εις τον οικον αυτου εν αυτη τη ωρα ευρον τον παιδα υγιαινοντα (...that hour. And the centurion, returning into his house in that hour, found his servant healthy) – א^{*,2} C E M (N) U X Θ Σ Φ (0250) ƒ^{1} 22 (33) 713 (1241) it^{g^{1}} syr^{h,pal} eth
Verse concludes with ωρα εκεινη (that hour) or ωρας εκεινης (that hour) or ημερα εκεινη (that day) – rell

Matthew 8:15

διηκονει αυτω (she was serving him) – א* B W Θ 700 𝔐^{pt} Lect it^{k} syr^{h} cop^{sa}
διηκονει αυτοις (she was serving them) – א^{1} L Δ ƒ^{1} ƒ^{13} 33 565 892 1424 𝔐^{pt} 𝑙^{844} 𝑙^{2211} lat syr^{s,c} cop^{bo}

Matthew 8:18

οχλον (the multitude) – B cop^{sa^{mss}}
οχλους (the multitudes) – א* ƒ^{1} 22 (1365) 𝑙^{(184)} cop^{(bo)} (Origen)
τους οχλους ερχομενους (the multitudes coming) – 𝑙^{(68)}
οχλον πολυν or πολυν οχλον (the vast multitude) – W 983 1216 1424 1689 𝑙^{524} 𝑙^{1074} it^{c,g^{1}} syr^{s,c} cop^{sa^{ms},mae-1} arm^{mss} eth^{ms} geo slav^{(mss)} (Speculum)
πολλους (many) – 1071 1546*
οχλους πολλους or πολλους οχλους (the many multitudes) – א^{2} C E G K L N X Δ Θ Π Σ 0233 ƒ^{13} 33 108 157 180 205 565 579 597 700 892 1006 1009 1010 1079 1195 1230 1242 1243 1253 1292 1342 1505 1546^{c} 1646 2148 2174 𝔐 Lect lat syr^{p,h,pal} arm^{mss} goth eth slav^{mss} Diatessaron Hilary Chromatius Chrysostom Augustine

Matthew 8:18

εκελευσεν τους μαθητας αυτου απελθειν (he commanded his disciples to depart) – it^{a,aur,b,c,g^{1},q} vg^{mss} Hilary
εκελευσεν τοις μαθηταις αυτου απελθειν (he gave the command to his disciples to depart) – it^{h,l} syr^{c} (goth)
κελευει δε μονοις τοις μαθηταις απελθειν (but he gave command only to his disciples to depart) – Cyril
εκελευσεν απελθειν (he gave the command to depart) – rell

Matthew 8:21

των μαθητων (of the disciples) – א B 33 2148 𝑙^{1761} it^{a,b,c,h,q} cop^{sa} slav Chromatius
των μαθητων αυτου (of his disciples) – C E G K L N W X Δ Θ Π Σ 0250 ƒ^{1} ƒ^{13} 157 180 205 565 579 597 700 892 1006 1009 1010 1071 1079 1195 1216 1242 1243 1292 1342 1424 1505 1546 1646 2174 𝔐 Lect it^{aur,ff^{1},g^{1},(k),l} vg syr cop^{bo,mae} goth arm eth geo Jerome Speculum
των αυτου (of him) – 1365
Text omitted – 1230 1253 Chrysostom

Matthew 8:22

Ιησους (Jesus) – omitted by א 33 it^{b,c,k,q} syr^{s}

Matthew 8:22

ο δε ιησους λεγει – B syr^{cur}
ο δε λεγει – א 33 b c k q syr^{s}

Matthew 8:25

και προσελθοντες (And coming near) – א B 33^{vid} 591 892 930 1421* it^{a,aur,c,ff^{1},k,l} vg^{mss} syr^{pal^{mss}} cop^{sa,bo} Jerome
και προσελθοντες οι μαθηται (And those disciples came near) – C^{2} E K L Δ Π ƒ^{13} 22 157 180 565 579 597 700 1006 1009 1010 1071 1079 1216 1230 1242 1243 1253 1292 1342 1365 1505 1546 2148 2175 𝔐 Lect^{mss} it^{h} vg^{ms} arm geo^{mss} Eusebius Chromatius
και προσελθοντες οι μαθηται αυτου (And those disciples of his came near) – W X Θ Σ Φ ƒ^{1} 205 1195 1424 1646 𝑙^{127} 𝑙^{184} 𝑙^{253} 𝑙^{384} 𝑙^{770} 𝑙^{773} 𝑙^{1016^{pt}} 𝑙^{1780} it^{b,g^{1},(q)} vg^{mss} syr goth eth geo^{mss} slav Diatessaron
και προσελθοντες αυτω οι μαθηται (And those disciples came to him) – geo^{mss}
και προσελθοντες αυτω οι μαθηται αυτου (And those disciples of his came to him) – C*^{vid} vg^{mss} cop^{mae}

Matthew 8:25

σωσον (help!) – א B C ƒ^{1} ƒ^{13^{mss}} 33 205 892 𝑙^{547} syr^{pal^{mss}} cop^{bo^{mss}} Cyril^{pt}
σωσον ημας (help us!) – E K L W X Δ Θ Π Σ 0242^{vid} ƒ^{13^{mss}} 22 157 180 565 579 597 700 828^{c} 1006 1009 1010 1071 1079 1195 1216 1230 1242 1243 1253 1292 1342 1365 1424 1505 1546 1646 2148 2174 𝔐 Lect Latt syr cop arm goth eth geo slav Diatessaron Origen Eusebius Ambrose Gaudentius Chrysostom Chromatius Jerome Augustine Cyril^{pt} Hesychius

Matthew 8:26

τω ανεμω και τη θαλασση – א f^{1} f^{13} 22
τοις ανεμοις και τη θαλασση – Β

Matthew 8:26

τω ανεμω (the wind) – א* ƒ^{1} ƒ^{13} 22 it^{mss} vg syr^{s,p} cop^{sa^{ms},bo^{mss},mae-1} Eusebius Basil
τοις ανεμοις (the winds) – rell

Matthew 8:28

Γεργεσηνων (Gergesenes) – א^{2} C^{mg} E K L W X Π ƒ^{1} ƒ^{13} 22 157 180 205 565 579 597 700 892* 1006 1009 1071 1079 1195 1216 1230 1242 1243 1253 1292 1342 1365 1424 1505 1546 1646 2148 2174 𝔐 Lect syr^{h^{mg},pal} cop^{bo} arm goth eth geo^{mss} slav Diatessaron^{arm} Origen Eusebius^{vid} Apollinaris Epiphanius^{mss} Hesychius
Γερασηνων (Gerasenes) – 892^{c} Δ^{lat} Latt syr^{h^{mg}} cop^{sa,mae} Origen^{mss} Hilary Ambrose Chromatius
Γαζαρηνων (Gazarenes) – א*
Γαραδηνων (Garadenes) – Δ^{gr}
Γαδαρηνων (Gadarenes) – B C M Θ Σ 174 1010 𝑙^{253} syr^{s,p,h} geo^{mss} Diatessaron^{syr} Origen^{mss} Epiphanius

Matthew 8:29

Ιησου (Jesus) – omitted by א B C* L ƒ^{1} 33 892 it^{ff^{1},k,l} vg^{mss} syr^{s} cop^{bo^{mss},mae}

Matthew 8:29

ημας απολεσαι προ καιρου (destroy us before our time) – א* vg^{mss} cop^{bo^{mss}}
απολεσαι ημας και προ καιρου βασανισαι (destroy us and torment us before our time) – W
προ καιρου βασανισαι ημας (torment us before our time) – rell

Matthew 8:30

non longe (not far) – it^{a,aur,b,c,f,ff^{1},g^{1},h,l} vg sax
μακραν (far) – rell

Matthew 8:30

πολλων (many) – omitted by Θ 565 syr^{(s)}

Matthew 8:31

αποστειλον ημας (send us) – א B Θ 0242^{vid} ƒ^{1} 22 33 372 892* 𝑙^{844} 𝑙^{2211} lat syr^{s} cop Cyril
επιτρεψον ημιν απελθειν (allow us to depart) – C L W X Δ ƒ^{13} 565 700 𝔐 Lect it^{f,h,q} syr^{p,h} goth
επιταξον ημιν και απελευσομεθα (give the command to us, and we will depart) – Codex Schøyen

Matthew 8:32

τους χοιρους (those pigs) – א B C* 0242 ƒ^{1} 22 33 372 892 1010 lat syr^{s,p} cop
την αγελην την χοιρων (that herd of pigs) – C^{3} K L M N W X Δ Θ Π ƒ^{13} 565 579 700 1424 𝔐 Lect it^{f,h} syr^{h,pal} goth
Text omitted – 157

Matthew 8:32

αγελη (herd) – א B C* M N W Δ Θ ƒ^{1} ƒ^{13} 33 157 892 1424 Latt syr cop^{sa}
αγελη των χοιρων (herd of pigs) – C^{3} K L X Π 22 565 579 700 𝔐 Lect cop^{bo,mae} goth

Matthew 8:34

των οριων (the borders) – omitted by syr^{s}

50 Textual variants in Matthew 9

Matthew 9:1

εμβας ο Ιησους (embarking, Jesus) – C^{(3)} F Θ^{c} ƒ^{13} vg^{mss}
εμβας (embarking) – rell

Matthew 9:2

αμαρτιαι (sins) – א B C* D W Δ^{c} 0281 ƒ^{1} 33 892 𝑙^{844} 𝑙^{2211} it^{k} vg^{ms}
αμαρτιαι σου (your sins) – C^{(3)} L Δ Θ 0233^{vid} ƒ^{13} 𝔐 Lect lat syr

Matthew 9:4

ιδων (seeing) – א C D E* F G K L (N) W X Δ Π^{*,(mg)} Σ 0233 0281 ƒ^{13} 22 33 180 240 244 579 892 1006 1009 1010 1071 1216 1230 1242 1243 1253 1292 1342 1365 1505 1646 2148 𝔐 Lect^{mss} latt syr^{s,pal^{mss}} cop^{bo} eth^{mss} slav Chromatius Jerome Augustine Speculum
ειδως (perceiving) – B E^{c} M Π^{c} (Θ) ƒ^{1} 157 205 565 597 700 1079 1195 1424 1546 𝑙^{(76)} 𝑙^{184} 𝑙^{253} 𝑙^{313} 𝑙^{(547)} 𝑙^{672} 𝑙^{673} 𝑙^{813} 𝑙^{844} 𝑙^{1223} 𝑙^{1627} 𝑙^{1761} 𝑙^{2211} syr^{(p),h} cop^{sa,mae} arm goth eth^{mss} geo Chrysostom

Matthew 9:4b

εγειρε περιπατει – א cop^{sa} syr
εγειρε και περιπατει – Β

Matthew 9:6a

εγειρε – Β 372
εγειρε και – D
εγερθεις – א C L W Θ 0233 f^{1} f^{13} Byz q

Matthew 9:6b

πορευου – א, cop^{sa} and cop^{bo} used different terms, but every concerned to πορευου
υπαγε – Β

Matthew 9:8

εφοβηθησαν (they were afraid) – א B D W 0281 ƒ^{1} 22 33 59 143 205 372 496 517 751 892 930 951 1192 1424 1532 1675 1823 2147 2459 2586 2637 2737 lat syr^{s,p,pal} cop Hilary Chromatius Augustine
εθαυμασαν (they were astounded) – C E F G K L N Δ Θ Π Σ Φ 0233 ƒ^{13} 157 180 565 579 597 700 1006 1009 1010 1071 1079 1195 1216 1230 1242 1243 1253 1292 1342 1365 1505 1546 1646 2148 𝔐 Lect syr^{h} arm eth^{mss} geo slav Chrysostom
εφοβηθησαν και εθαυμασαν (they were afraid and they were astounded) – it^{(f)} (goth) eth^{(mss)} Diatessaron
Text omitted – X 213 Irenaeus^{lat}

Matthew 9:9

εκειθεν (from there) – omitted by א* L cop^{bo^{ms}}

Matthew 9:9b

λεγει – א cop^{sa}
και λεγει – Β cop^{bo}

Matthew 9:9c

ηκολουθει – א D f^{1} 21 892
ηκολουθησεν – B

Matthew 9:10a

και ανακειμενου – א
και εγενετο αυτου ανακειμενου – B

Matthew 9:10b

ιδου – א D 892
και ιδου – Β

Matthew 9:10c

ελθοντες – א 243 ℓ 50
omit – B

Matthew 9:11

δια τι μετα των τελωνων και αμαρτωλων εσθιετε και πινει ο διδασκαλος υμων (How come you^{pl} are eating and your teacher is drinking with tax collectors and sinners?) – M 565 cop^{mae}
δια τι μετα των τελωνων και αμαρτωλων εσθιετε και πινετε (Why are you^{pl} eating and drinking with tax collectors and sinners?) – syr^{s}
δια τι μετα των τελωνων και αμαρτωλων εσθιει (Why is he eating with tax collectors and sinners?) – it^{a}
δια τι μετα των τελωνων και αμαρτωλων καθησαι (Why are you seated with tax collectors and sinners?) – it^{k}
δια τι μετα των τελωνων και αμαρτωλων εσθιει ο διδασκαλος υμων (Why is your teacher eating with tax collectors and sinners?) – rell

Matthew 9:12

Ιησους (Jesus) – omitted by א B D 0233* 0281 892 1010 1424 𝑙^{844} it^{a,f,h,q} syr^{s} cop^{sa,mae}

Matthew 9:12

ιατρων – א
ιατρου – Β

Matthew 9:13

αμαρτωλους (sinners) – א B D N W Γ* Δ 0233 ƒ^{1} 22 33 174 372 565 𝑙^{844} 𝑙^{2211} lat syr^{p,h} cop^{bo^{mss},mae-2} goth
αμαρτωλους εις μετανοιαν (sinners into repentance) – C L X Θ 0281 ƒ^{13} 700 𝔐 it^{c,g^{1}} syr^{s,h^{mg},pal} cop^{sa,bo^{mss},mae-1} Basil

Matthew 9:14

νηστευομεν πολλα (much fasting) – א^{2} C D E F G K L N W X Δ Θ Π Σ Φ 0233 ƒ^{1} ƒ^{13} 22 33 157 (180) 205 565 579 597 700 892 1006 1009 1010 1071 1079 1195 1216 1230 1242 1243 1253 1292 1342 1365 1424 1505 1546 1646 2148 2174 𝔐 Lect it^{d,(k)} syr^{p,h,pal} cop^{sa^{(mss)},bo,mae-1} goth eth geo^{mss} Basil Chrysostom
νηστευομεν πυκνα (frequent fasting) – א^{1} lat syr^{(s)} arm Hilary Chromatius Jerome Augustine
νηστευομεν (fasting) – א* B 0281 10 27* 71 86 179 569 692 895 947 982 1091* 1170 1194 1386 1413 1517* 2487* 2581 2676 cop^{sa^{ms},mae-2} geo^{mss} Cyril

Matthew 9:15

οι υιοι του νυμφιου (the children of the bridegroom) – D lat
οι υιοι του νυμφωνος (the children of the bridal chamber) – rell

Matthew 9:15

νηστευειν (fast) – D W 1424 it syr^{(s),p,h^{mg}} cop^{sa,bo^{mss},mae}
πενθειν (grieve) – rell

Matthew 9:15

αρθη (taken up) – D ƒ^{1}
αφερθη (taken away) – W
απαρθη (taken away) – rell

Matthew 9:15

και τοτε νηστευσουσιν εν εκειναις ταις ημεραις (and then they will fast in those days) – D it syr^{h^{mg}}
και τοτε νηστευσουσιν (and then they will fast) – rell

Matthew 9:15

ελευσονται – א*
omit – B

Matthew 9:16

το πληρομα αυτου – Β
το πληρομα –א

Matthew 9:17

ει δει μη – Β 301 cop^{sa}
ει δε μηγε – א

Matthew 9:18

ιδου αρχων προσελθων – א 13 157
ιδου αρχων εις προσελθων – Β
ιδου αρχων εισελθων – א^{c} C D E M X N W Σ Φ
ιδου αρχων εις ελθων – Κ S V Δ Π

Matthew 9:18

ελθων (upon coming) – (Δ) it^{q} cop^{bo}
τις ελθων (someone, upon coming) – Γ 1010 it^{(h),k}
εις ελθων (one, upon coming) – K M Y Π 33 565 579 892 𝔐 it^{(d),f} syr^{(s)} goth
εισελθων (upon entering) – ƒ^{1} 22 124 700 1071 1424
εις ελθων or εισελθων (one, upon coming or upon entering) – א^{2} C* D E N W X Θ
προσελθων (upon approaching) – א* L^{c} 69 157 cop^{sa}
τις προσελθων (someone, upon approaching) – C^{c} (F) G L* U ƒ^{13} 2 1006 it^{g^{1}}
εις προσελθων (one, upon approaching) – א^{1} B it^{a,b,c,ff^{1}} vg

Matthew 9:18

κυριε (sir) – M it^{f,ff^{1},h} vg^{mss}
text omitted – א D ƒ^{1} ƒ^{13} 33 892 it^{mss} vg^{mss}
οτι (that) – rell

Matthew 9:19

ηκολουθησαν (they followed) – E M syr^{p}
ηκολουθησεν (he followed) – B L W Θ ƒ^{1} ƒ^{13} 𝔐
ηκολουθει (he was following) – א C D 33 lat

Matthew 9:21

εαν αψωμαι (If I should touch) – א* it^{a,h} syr^{s}
εαν αψωμαι μονον (If I should touch only) – D lat
εαν μονον αψωμαι (If only I should touch) – rell

Matthew 9:22

Ιησους (Jesus) – omitted by א* D it syr^{s}

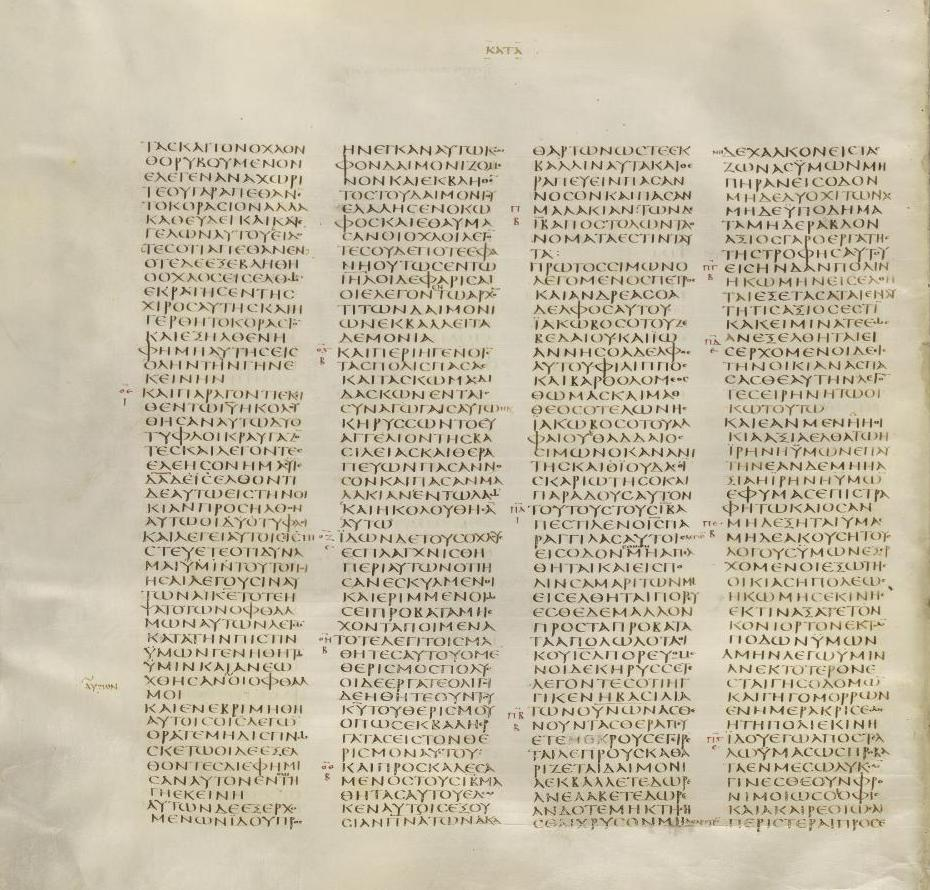
Sinaiticus, Matthew 9:23-10:17

Matthew 9:22

εστη στραφεις (standing, he turned) – D
επιστραφεις (turning around) – C L W Θ ƒ^{1} 𝔐
στραφεις (he turned) – א B N ƒ^{13} 33 892 1010 𝑙^{844} 𝑙^{2211}

Matthew 9:24

λεγει (he says) – N
λεγει αυτοις (he says to them) – C L W Θ 𝔐 it^{(f),(g^{1})} syr
ελεγεν (he was saying) – א B D ƒ^{1} ƒ^{13} 33 892 lat cop

Matthew 9:24

ειδοτες οτι απεθανεν – א 61
omit – B

Matthew 9:25

ελθων (upon coming) – D 1424 it
εισελθων (upon entering) – rell

Matthew 9:26

η φημη αὕτη αυτου (this report of him) – geo^{mss}
η φημη αυτου (the report of him) – D 1424 it^{d} cop^{sa,mae-2} eth^{mss} geo^{mss}
η φημη αυτης (the report of her) – א C^{c} N^{vid} Θ ƒ^{1} 33 124 157 1195* syr^{pal} cop^{bo,mae-1} eth^{ms}
η φημη αυτος (the same report) – C*
η φημη αὐτή (the same report) – L Γ 28
η φημη αυτη (this report or the same report) – B W Δ
η φημη αὕτη (this report) – Π ƒ^{13} 22 565 700 892 1009 1010 1071 1079 1195c 1216 1230 1242 1253 1365 1546 1646 2148 2174 𝔐 Lect lat syr^{s,p,h} arm goth geo^{mss} Diatessaron Augustine

Matthew 9:27a

ηκολουθησαν – Β D
ηκολουθησαν αυτω –א

Matthew 9:27b

κραυγαζοντες – א
κραζοντες – B

Matthew 9:27c

υιος – B G U Π
υιε – א

Matthew 9:28

οι δυο τυφλοι (the two blind men) – א* D it^{a,b,h} vg^{mss}
οι τυφλοι (the blind men) – rell

Matthew 9:28

και ερχεται (And he comes) – D
εισελθοντι δε αυτω (But, upon entering, he) – א* N (1424)
ελθοντος δε αυτου (But, upon coming, he) – 700 it^{f}
ελθοντι δε (But, upon coming) – rell

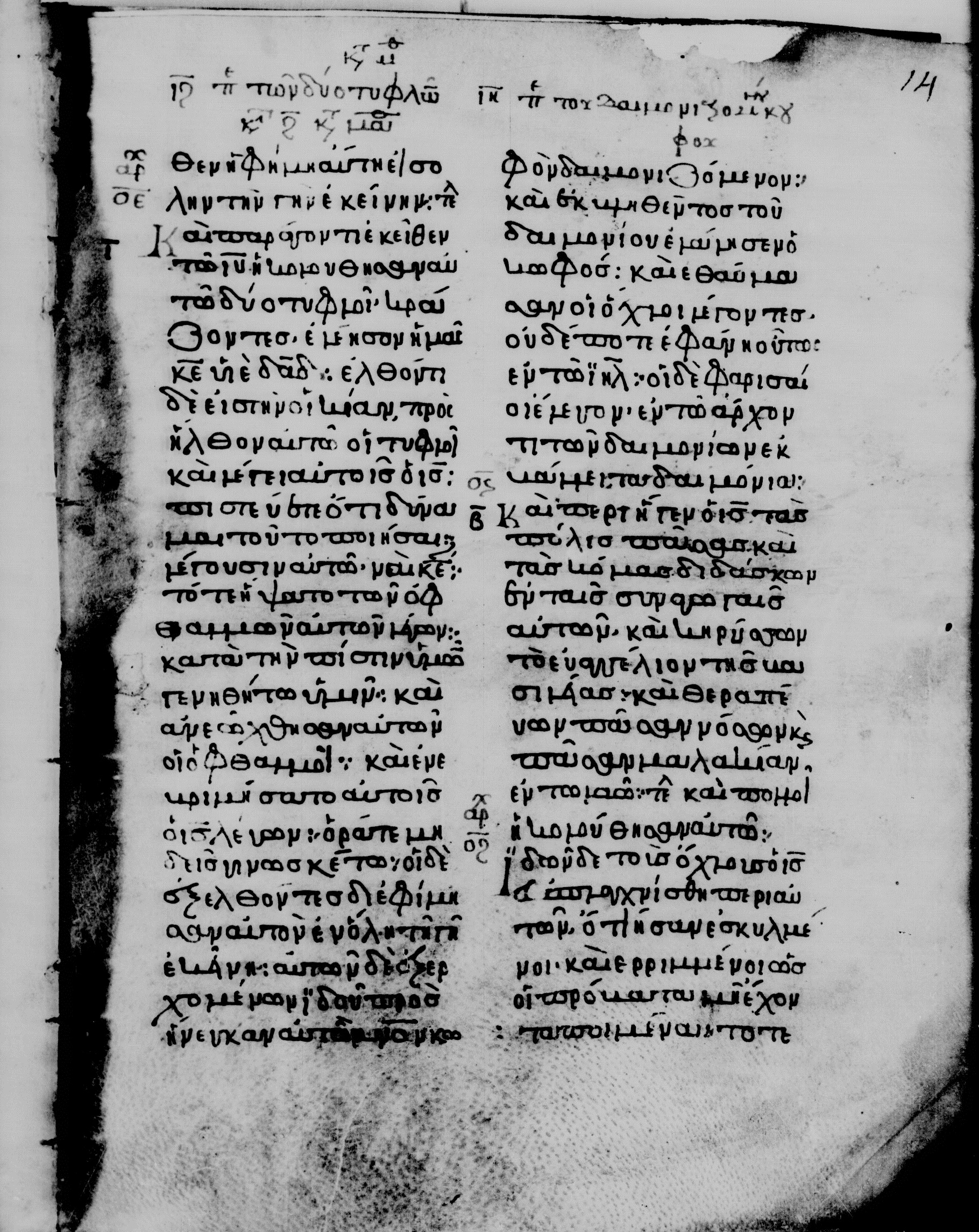
Codex 828 with text of Matthew 9:26-36

9:30a

ηνεωχυησαν – B D N Σ
ηνοιχθησαν – C
ανεωχθησαν –א

9:30b

οι οφθαλμοι – א
οι οφθαλμοι αυτων – D
αυτων οι οφθαλμοι – B

Matthew 9:31

εν τη γη εκεινη – א
εν ολη τη γη εκεινη – Β

Matthew 9:32

ανθρωπον (man) – omitted by א B ƒ^{13} 124 788 892 syr^{s,p} cop

Matthew 9:34

Verse omitted — D it^{a,d, k} syr^{s} Diatessaron Juvencus Hilary

Matthew 9:35

μαλακιαν εν τω λαω και πολλοι ηκολουθησαν αυτω (sickness among the people, and many followed him) – א^{1} L ƒ^{13} 517 1010 1424 it^{g^{1}}
μαλακιαν εν τω λαω και ηκολουθησαν αυτω (sickness among the people, and they followed him) – א*
μαλακιαν και πολλοι ηκολουθησαν αυτω (sickness, and many followed him) – it^{a,b,h}
μαλακιας αυτων τας εν αυτων (their sicknesses that were in them) – Codex Schøyen
μαλακιαν εν τω λαω (sickness among the people) – C^{3} E F G K X Γ Θ Π 28 579 700 788^{c} 𝔐^{mss} it^{c,g^{1}} vg^{mss} syr^{pal} arm geo
μαλακιαν (sickness) – א^{2} B C* D N S W Δ ƒ^{1} 22 33 157 209 565 788 892 𝔐^{mss} it^{mss} vg syr^{s,p,h} cop goth

Matthew 9:35

Minuscule 828 has additional reading εν τω λαω και πολλοι ηκολουθησαν αυτω

Matthew 9:36

ο Ιησους εσπλαγχνισθη (Jesus, brought to compassion) – C (G) N ƒ^{13} it^{(g^{1})} vg^{(mss)} syr^{p,h} cop^{mae-1}
εσπλαγχνισθη (he was brought to compassion) – rell

Matthew 9:36

εκλελυμενοι (wearied) – L 1424 it^{d} syr^{s,p}
εσκυλμενοι (troubled) – rell

31 Textual variants in Matthew 10

Matthew 10:1

μαλακιαν εν τω λαω (sickness among the people) – L it^{b,g^{1}}
μαλακιαν (sickness) – rell

Matthew 10:3

Θαδδαιος (Thaddaeus) – א B 17 124 130 788 892 𝑙^{185} 𝑙^{2211} it^{aur,c,ff^{1},l} vg cop Jerome Augustine
Λεββαιος (Lebbaeus) – D it^{d,(k),μ} Origen^{lat} Hesychius Augustine^{mss}
Θαδδαιος ο επικληθεις Λεββαιος (Thaddaeus who is surnamed Lebbaeus) – 13 346 543 826 828
Λεββαιος ο επικληθεις Θαδδαιος (Lebbaeus who is surnamed Thaddaeus) – C^{2} E F G K L N W X Δ Θ Π Σ ƒ^{1} 22 28 33 157 180 205 565 579 597 700 1006 1009 1010 1071 1079 1195 1216 1230 1242 1243 1253 1292 1342 1344 1365 1424 1505 1546 1646 2148 2174 Byz/𝔐 Lect it^{f} syr^{p,h,pal^{mss}} (arm) geo slav Apostolic Constitutions, Chrysostom
Λεββεδαιος ο επικληθεις Θαδδαιος (Lebbedaeus who is surnamed Thaddaeus) – eth
Λεββαιος ο και Θαδδαιος (Lebbaeus who is also Thaddaeus) – C*^{vid}
Iudas Zelotes (Judas the Zealot) – it^{a,b,g^{1},h,q} syr^{pal^{(mss)}}
Ιουδας ο και Λεββαιος ο επικληθεις Θαδδαιος (Judas who is also Lebbaeus who is surnamed Thaddaeus) – 243 854
text omitted – syr^{s} (but adds Judas the son of James in Matthew 10:4)

Matthew 10:4

Καναναιος (Cananaean) – B C L N ƒ^{1} 33 892 1010 lat cop
Χαναναιος (Chananaean) – D it^{d}
Κανανιτης (Canaanite) – א W Θ ƒ^{13} 28 𝔐 syr^{h}

Matthew 10:4

Ισκαριωτης (Iscariot) – א B K L W X Γ Δ Θ Π ƒ^{1} ƒ^{13} 28 33 565 700 892 1009 1010 1071 1079 1195 1216 1230 1242 1253 1344 1365 1546 1646 2148 2174 𝔐 Lect vg^{mss} syr^{h} cop Chrysostom
Ισκαριωθ (Iscariot) – C 1424 𝑙^{150}
Σκαριωτης (Scariot) – D it^{d,f,k,l} vg^{mss} syr^{s,p,pal^{mss}} arm geo
Scarioth – it^{a,b,c,ff^{1},g^{1},h}
Scariota – it^{q}
Carioth – it^{aur}
Σιμωνος Ισκαριωτου (Simon Iscariot's [son]) – Origen

Matthew 10:7

μετανοειτε οτι (Repent, because) – 251 cop^{sa^{mss}}
omit text – B syr^{s}
οτι (that) – rell

Matthew 10:8

νεκρους εγειρετε λεπρους καθαριζετε δαιμονια εκβαλλετε (raise the dead, cleanse the leprous, cast out demons) – א B C* N Σ Φ Ω 0281^{vid} ƒ^{1} ƒ^{13} 22 33 108 157 349 399 543 565 700^{mg} 892 1010 𝑙^{2211} it^{a,b,c,d,h,k,l,q} vg cop^{bo} eth geo^{mss} Hilary Chrysostom Cyril
νεκρους εγειρατε λεπρους καθαρεισατε και δαιμονια εκβαλετε (raise the dead, cleanse the leprous, and cast out demons) – D syr^{s}
λεπρους καθαριζετε δαιμονια εκβαλλετε νεκρους εγειρετε (cleanse the leprous, cast out demons, raise the dead) – P W Δ 566 1573 2145 syr^{h}
λεπρους καθαριζετε νεκρους εγειρετε δαιμονια εκβαλλετε (cleanse the leprous, raise the dead, cast out demons) – 16 348 372 1093 1579
λεπρους καθαριζετε δαιμονια εκβαλλετε (cleanse the leprous, cast out demons) – C^{c} E F G K L M S U V X Y Γ Θ Π 28 118 124 174 700* 788 𝔐 it^{f} syr^{(p),pal} cop^{sa,mae-1} arm eth^{mss} geo^{mss} Juvencus Eusebius Basil Jerome
δαιμονια εκβαλλετε λεπρους καθαριζετε – (cast out demons, cleanse the leprous) – 28
δαιμονια εκβαλλετε (cast out demons) – 1424*

Matthew 10:10

ραβδον (staff) – א B D Θ ƒ^{1} 33 892 1424 𝑙^{2211} lat syr^{s,p} cop Eusebius
ραβδους (staffs) – C L W ƒ^{13} 𝔐 Lect it^{a,ff^{1},h,μ} syr^{h} cop^{bo^{ms}}

Matthew 10:10

του μισθου αυτου (their wage) – K 565 892 it^{mss} syr^{h^{mg}}
της τροφης αυτου (their food) – rell

Matthew 10:11

η πολις εις ην αν εισελθητε εις αυτην (The city into which you^{pl} might enter, into it) – D it^{d}
εις ην δ’ αν πολιν εισελθητε (But into whichever city you^{pl} might enter) – ƒ^{1} 700 it^{a,b,ff^{1},h,k} syr^{s}
εις ην δ’ αν πολιν εισελθητε η κωμην (But into whichever city you^{pl} might enter, or a village) – L 0281 ƒ^{13} cop
εις ην δ’ αν πολιν η κωμην εισελθητε (But into whichever city or village you^{pl} might enter) – א B C W 𝔐 Lect it^{aur,c,f,g^{1},l,q} vg syr^{p,h} rell

Matthew 10:12

ασπασασθε αυτην λεγοντες ειρηνη τω οικω τουτω (greet it, saying, "Peace unto this house") – א^{*,2} D L W Θ ƒ^{1} 22 346 517 713 1010 (1424) it vg^{mss} arm
ασπασασθε αυτην (greet it) – א^{1} B C ƒ^{13} 𝔐 Lect it^{k,l} vg^{mss} syr cop rell

Matthew 10:12

λεγοντες ειρηνη τω οικω τουτω – Sinaiticus*^{,2}, D, L, W, Θ, f^{1} 1010 (1424), it vg^{cl}
αυτην – majority of mss

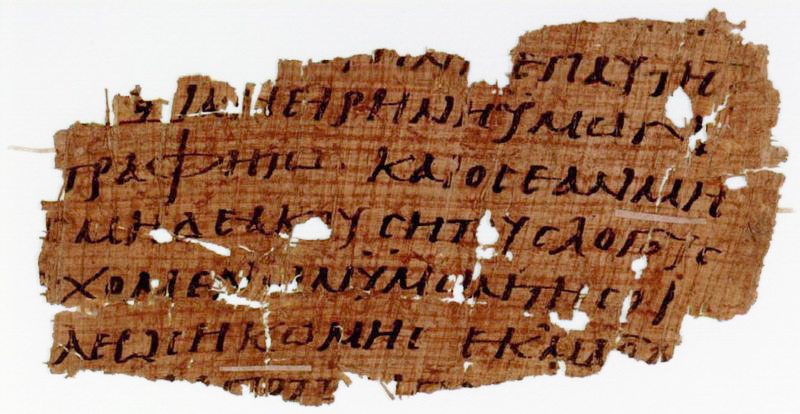
Matthew 10:13-15 in 𝔓^{110}

Matthew 10:13

εφ’ (upon) – א B W 892 1010 𝑙^{2211}
προς (toward) – rell

Matthew 10:14

της οικιας η (that house or) – omitted by D arm

Matthew 10:14

πολεως η κωμης (city or village) – 𝔓^{110} א (0281) ƒ^{13} 892 vg^{mss} cop
πολεως (city) – rell

Matthew 10:14

εκ των ποδων υμων (out of your feet) – א C 0281 33 892 lat
απο των ποδων υμων (away from your feet) – 𝔓^{110}
των ποδων υμων (of your feet) – rell

Matthew 10:16

ο οφις (the serpent) – א* Origen^{pt} Epiphanius
οι οφεις (the serpents) – rell

Matthew 10:16

απλουστατοι (simple) – D
ακεραιοι (innocent) – rell

Matthew 10:18

επι ηγεμονων σταθησεσθε (you^{pl} will be caused to stand before governors) – D (0171) it^{(mss)}
επι βασιλεις δε και ηγεμονας στησεσθε (But you^{pl} will be caused to stand before kings and governors) – syr^{s}
επι ηγεμονας δε και βασιλεις αχθησεσθε (But you^{pl} will be lead before governors and kings) – rell

Matthew 10:19

πως η (how or) – omitted by it^{a,b,ff^{1},k} syr^{s,pal} Cyprian Epiphanius Augustine

Matthew 10:19

δοθησεται γαρ υμιν εν εκεινη τη ωρα τι λαλησητε (for it will be given to you^{pl} in that hour what you^{pl} should speak) – omitted by D L it^{g^{1},k} vg^{mss} Epiphanius

Matthew 10:23

φευγετε εις την ετεραν (flee into a different one) – א B W 33 265 333 423 492 527^{c} 719 822 892 900 935 936 1020 1192 1227 1253 1289 1424 1532 1541 1602 2147 2372 𝑙^{813} Origen^{pt}, Peter of Alexandria, Eusebius Athanasius, Apostolic Constitutions, Chrysostom^{lem} Socrates^{pt} Cyril Theodoret^{mss}
φευγετε εις την αλλην (flee into another) – C E F G K N X Δ Π Σ Φ 28 157 180 372 579 597 700 1006 1009 1010 1071 1079 1195 1216 1230 1242 1243 1292 1342 1344 1365 1505 1546 1646 2148 2174 2737 𝔐 Lect Clement Origen^{mss} Basil, Apostolic Constitutions, Socrates^{pt}
φευγετε εις την ετεραν or φευγετε εις την αλλην (flee into a different one or flee into another) – it^{aur,c,f,l} vg syr^{s,p,h} cop arm eth goth geo^{mss} slav Ambrose Jerome Augustine
φευγετε εις την ετεραν καν εκ ταυτης διωκωσιν υμας φευγετε εις την αλλην (flee into a different one, and if they may persecute you^{pl} out of this one, flee into another) – ƒ^{1} ƒ^{13} 22 23 134 188 205 375 (828) 1166 1595 Diatessaron^{arm}
φευγετε εις την αλλην καν εκ ταυτης διωκωσιν υμας φευγετε εις την ετεραν (flee into another, and if they may persecute you^{pl} out of this one, flee into a different one) – (L) Θ 163 247 934 1193 1229 1314 1353* 1678 2118 2660 2701^{supp} 2786 Origen^{(pt)}
φευγετε εις την αλλην καν εκ ταυτης διωκωσιν υμας φευγετε εις την αλλην (flee into another, and if they may persecute you^{pl} out of this one, flee into another) – 565 2145^{c}
φευγετε εις την αλλην εαν δε εν τη αλλη διωκουσιν υμας φευγετε εις την αλλην (flee into another, but if they are persecuting you^{pl} in the other, flee into another) – D (0171)^{vid} it^{d} Origen^{(pt)}
One of the four latter variants from above – it^{a,b,}ff^{1},g^{1},(h),(k),q vg^{mss} geo^{mss} Diatessaron^{mss} Hilary Petilianus

Matthew 10:25

βελζεβουλ (Belzebul) – D it^{d}
βεελζεβουλ (Beelzebul) – 𝔓^{110} C (L) W Θ ƒ^{1} ƒ^{13} 33 𝔐 Lect it^{mss} syr^{h} cop Cyprian
βεεζεβουλ (Beezebul) – א B
Βεελζεβυβ (Beelzebub) – it^{c,(ff^{1})} vg syr^{s,p}

Matthew 10:35

υιον (son) – D it syr^{s,c}
ανθρωπον (man) – rell

Matthew 10:37

και ο φιλων υιον η θυγατερα υπερ εμε ουκ εστιν μου αξιος (and the one loving son or daughter more than me is not worthy of me) – omitted by 𝔓^{19} B* D 983 1009 𝑙^{871} it^{d} syr^{h} Codex Schøyen

Matthew 10:38

Verse omitted – 𝔓^{19} M*

Matthew 10:38

μου μαθητες (my disciple) – it^{c,k} Cyprian
μου αδελφος (my brother) – Clement
μου αξιος (worthy of me) – rell

Matthew 10:39

ο ευρων την ψυχην αυτου απολεσει αυτην και (The one finding his life will lose it, and) – omitted by א*

Matthew 10:41

και ο δεχομενος δικαιον εις ονομα δικαιου μισθον δικαιου λημψεται (and the one receiving a righteous man in the name of a righteous man will receive a righteous man's reward) – omitted by D

Matthew 10:42

ελαχιστων τουτων (of the least of these) – D latt
μικρων τουτων των ελαχιστων (of the least of these little ones) – 1424
μικρων τουτων (of these little ones) – rell

Matthew 10:42

ποτηριον ψυχρου (a cold cup) – E* geo^{mss}
ποτηριον ψυχρου μονον (a cold cup only) – 𝔓^{19} א B C K L P W Δ Θ Π ƒ^{1} ƒ^{13} 28 700 892 1009 1079 1195 1230 1253 1365 1546 1646 2174 𝔐 Lect it^{k} syr^{p,h,pal^{mss}}
ποτηριον ψυχρον μονον (a cold cup only) – M X Z 2* 33 157 565 1010 1071 1216 1242 1344 2148 𝑙^{184} 𝑙^{1231} 𝑙^{1663}
ποτηριον υδατος ψυχρου (a cup of cold water) – D it^{d} syr^{s,c} cop eth^{mss} (Clement) Origen^{pt} Cyprian Hilary Augustine
ποτηριον υδατος ψυχρου μονον (a cup of cold water only) – lat syr^{pal^{mss}} arm goth eth^{mss} geo^{mss} Origen^{pt}

Matthew 10:42

ου μη αποληται ο μισθος αυτου (his reward should not in any way be lost) – D it^{a,b,c,d,g^{1},h,k,q} syr^{s,c} cop^{bo,mae-2} Cyprian
ου μη απολεση τον μισθον αυτου (he should not lose his reward) – rell

26 Textual variants in Matthew 11

Matthew 11:1

δωδεκα (twelve) – omitted by ƒ^{1} 22 Codex Schøyen

Matthew 11:2

Ιησου (Jesus) – D 047 0233 7 99 262 348 349 483 484 517 659 954 1071 1216 1424 1579 1604 𝑙^{241} it^{d} syr^{c} eth Origen Chrysostom
κυριου ημων (our lord) – syr^{s}
omit text – Codex Schøyen
Χριστου (Christ) – rell

Matthew 11:2

δια των μαθητων αυτου (through his disciples) – א B C* D P W Z Δ Θ Π^{c} Σ 0233 ƒ^{13} 33 124 174 788 𝑙^{844} 𝑙^{2211} it^{d,q} syr^{p,h} cop^{sa,mae-1} arm slav Origen^{pt}
δυο των μαθητων αυτου (two of his disciples) – C^{c} E F G L X ƒ^{1} 13 22 28 157 180 205 565 579 597 700 828 892 1006 1010 1071 1243 1292 1342 1424 1505 𝔐 Lect it^{aur,ff^{1},g^{1},l} vg syr^{h^{mg},pal} cop^{bo} geo^{mss} goth Origen^{pt} Chrysostom Jerome^{pt} Augustine
των μαθητων αυτου (his disciples) – it^{a,b,c,f,h,k} vg^{ms} syr^{s,c} geo^{(mss)} Hilary Jerome^{pt}

Matthew 11:3

εργαζομενος (works) – D*
ερχομενος (comes) – rell

Matthew 11:5

και χωλοι περιπατουσιν (and the lame are walking) – omitted by D it^{d} Clement

Matthew 11:5

και πτωχοι ευαγγελιζονται (and the poor are being evangelized) — omitted by it^{k} syr^{s} Diatessaron^{(syr)} Clement

Matthew 11:7

και μετα ταυτα (And after these things) – syr^{s}
τουτων δε πορευομενων (But these were going) – rell

Matthew 11:8

αλλα τι εξηλθατε ανθρωπον ιδειν (Moreover, why did you^{pl} go out? To see a man...) – א*
αλλα τι εξηλθατε ιδειν ανθρωπον (Moreover, what did you^{pl} go out to see? A man...) – rell

Matthew 11:8

εν μαλακοις (in delicacies) – א B D Z it^{a,aur,c,d,ff^{1},g^{1},k,q} vg
εν μαλακοις ιματιοις (in delicate garments) – C L P W X Δ Θ 0233 ƒ^{1} ƒ^{13} 22 33 𝔐 Lect it^{b,f,h,l} syr cop goth

Matthew 11:9

αλλα τι εξηλθατε προφητην ιδειν (Moreover, why did you^{pl} go out? To see a prophet?) – א* B^{1} W Z 0281 892 cop^{bo,mae} eth^{mss} Origen^{pt} Chrysostom^{pt}
αλλα τι εξηλθατε ιδειν προφητην (Moreover, what did you^{pl} go out to see? A prophet?) – א^{1} B^{(*),2} C D E F G K L N O^{vid} P X Δ Θ Π Σ 0233 ƒ^{1} ƒ^{13} 28 33 157 180 205 565 579 597 700 1006 1009 1010 1071 1079 1195 1216 1230 1242 1243 1253 1292 1342 1365 1424 1505 1546 1646 2148 2174 𝔐 Lect latt syr cop^{sa} goth arm eth^{mss} geo slav Diatessaron^{arm} Origen^{pt} Ambrosiaster Hilary Chrysostom^{pt} Jerome Augustine Cyril

Matthew 11:13

και ο νομος (and the Law) – omitted by syr^{s} cop^{bo^{ms}}

Matthew 11:15

ωτα (ears) – B D 174 700 it^{d,k} syr^{s}
ωτα ακουειν (ears to hear) – א C E F G K L N W X Z Δ Θ Π Σ ƒ^{1} ƒ^{13} 28 33 157 180 205 565 579 597 892 1006 1009 1010 1071 1079 1195 1216 1230 1242 1243 1253 1292 1342 1365 1424 1505 1546 1646 2148 2174 𝔐 Lect lat syr cop arm eth geo slav goth^{vid} Diatessaron^{arm} Justin Clement Origen Chrysostom Jerome

Matthew 11:16

ετεροις (to others) – א B D Z^{vid} ƒ^{1} 28 892 it^{mss}
ετεροις αυτων (to their others) – C L W Θ ƒ^{13} 𝔐^{pt}
εταιροις (to friends) – G 565 700 1010 it^{aur,ff^{1},l} vg Hippolytus Origen
εταιροις αυτων (to their friends) – syr cop^{sa} 𝔐^{pt}

Matthew 11:17

εθρηνησαμεν (we lamented) – א B D Z ƒ^{1} 47 54 67 248 279 372 535 892 1061 1068* 1132 1254 1543 2586 2623 2737 𝑙^{48} 𝑙^{211^{pt}} 𝑙^{292} it^{aur,c,d,f,ff^{1},g^{1},k,l} vg^{mss} cop goth geo^{mss} Clement Gregory Chrysostom^{pt} Augustine^{pt}
εθρηνησαμεν υμιν (we lamented to you^{pl}) – C E F G K L N W X Δ Θ Π Σ Φ ƒ^{13} 22 28 33 118 157 180 205 565 579 597 700 1006 1009 1010^{c} 1071 1079 1195 1216 1230 1242 1243 1253 1292 1342 1365 1424 1505 1546 1582^{c} 1646 2148 2174 𝔐 Lect it^{a,b,ff^{2},h,q} vg^{mss} syr arm eth geo^{mss} slav Diatessaron Gregory^{mss} Didymus Chrysostom^{pt} Jerome Augustine^{pt} Hesychius

Matthew 11:18

ηλθεν γαρ προς υμας Ιωαννης (For John came unto you^{pl}) – (L) Θ ƒ^{13} 517 1675 syr^{(s),c,h} Codex Schøyen^{vid} Eusebius
ηλθεν γαρ Ιωαννης (For John came) – rell

Matthew 11:19

εργων αυτης (her deeds) – א B* W 124 202 788 1319 2145 syr^{p,h} cop^{sa^{mss},bo} eth^{mss} slav^{mss} Origen^{pt} (Apollinaris) Jerome^{mss}
τεκνων αυτης (her children) – B^{c} C D E F G K L N X Δ Θ Π Σ Φ ƒ^{1} 13 22 28 33 157 174 180 205 346 543 565 579 597 700 826 828 892 983 1006 1009 1010 1071 1079 1195 1216 1230 1242 1243 1253 1292 1342 1344 1365 1424 1505 1546 1646 2148 2174 2680 𝔐 Lect latt syr^{s,c,h^{mg}} cop^{sa^{mss},mae-1} goth arm eth^{mss} geo slav^{mss} Diatessaron Irenaeus^{lat} Origen^{pt} Hilary Ambrose Epiphanius Chrysostom Jerome Augustine
τεκνων αυτων (its children) – 165 1536 2290

Matthew 11:20

Τοτε ηρξατο ο Ιησους ονειδιζειν (Then Jesus began to reproach) – C K L N W Θ ƒ^{1} ƒ^{13} 565 579 892 𝔐^{pt} it^{g^{1},h} vg^{mss} syr co^{sa^{mss}}
Τοτε ηρξατο ονειδιζειν (Then he began to reproach) – rell

Matthew 11:21

Χοραζιν και Βηθσαιδα (Chorazin and Bethsaida!) – D it
Χοραζιν ουαι σοι Βηθσαιδα (Chorazin! Woe to you, Bethsaida!) – rell

Matthew 11:21

καθημενοι μετενοησαν (seated, repented) – א C 33
καθημεναι μετενοησαν (seated, repented) – Δ ƒ^{1} 892 1424 syr^{h}
μετενοησαν (repented) – rell

Matthew 11:23

και συ, Καφαρναουμ, μη εως ουρανου υψωθηση (And you, Capernaum, will not be raised up unto heaven) – א B* C* D W Θ 372 1253 it^{a,aur,b,c,d,ff^{1},ff^{2},(k),(l)} vg syr^{c} co arm eth geo Irenaeus^{lat} Gaudentius Jerome^{mss}
και συ, Καφαρναουμ, μη εως του ουρανου υψωθηση (And you, Capernaum, will not be raised up unto the heaven) – C^{c} Y ƒ^{1} 22
και συ, Καφαρναουμ, η εως ουρανου υψωθηση (And you, Capernaum, who unto heaven [you think] you will be raised) – B^{c}
και συ, Καφαρναουμ, η εως του ουρανου υψωθησει (And you, Capernaum, will you be raised up unto the heaven?) – L Jerome^{ms}
και συ, Καπερναουμ, η εως του ουρανου υψωθεισα (And you, Capernaum, who is elevated unto the heaven) – K M N Π* Σ 33 565 579 892 983 1009 1071 1079 1195 1216 1242 1243 1424 1505 1546 1582^{c} 1646 𝔐^{pt} Lect it^{h} syr^{s,p,h} (slav) Caesarius Chrysostom^{pt} Jerome^{ms}
και συ, Καπερναουμ, η εως ουρανου υψωθεισα (And you, Capernaum, who is elevated unto heaven) – X Δ 124 157 597 1230 1292
και συ, Καπερναουμ, η εως του ουρανου υψωθησ (And you, Capernaum, you who would be raised up unto the heaven) – E F G S U V Y Γ Π^{mg} 13 118 180 205 209 700 (828) 1006 1010 1342 1344 1364 2174 𝔐^{pt} it^{f,(g^{1}),q} Chrysostom^{pt} Maximus Jerome^{mss}
και συ, Καπερναουμ, εως ουρανου υψωθησ (And you, Capernaum, would be raised up unto heaven) – 2148
και συ, Καπερναουμ, η εως ουρανου υψωθησ (And you, Capernaum, you who would be raised up unto heaven) – 28 788

Matthew 11:23

καταβηση (you will descend) – B D W 163 372 2680 2737 latt syr^{s,c} cop^{sa} goth arm eth geo slav Irenaeus^{lat} Caesarius Jerome
καταβιβασθηση (you will be brought down) – א C E F G K L N X Y Δ Θ Π Σ Φ ƒ^{1} ƒ^{13} 22 28 33 157 180 205 565 579 597 700 892 1006 1009 1010 1071 1079 1195 1216 1230 1242 1243 1253 1292 1342 1344 1365 1424 1505 1546 1646 2148 2174 𝔐 Lect syr^{p,h} cop^{bo,mae-1} Gaudentius Chrysostom Pelagius

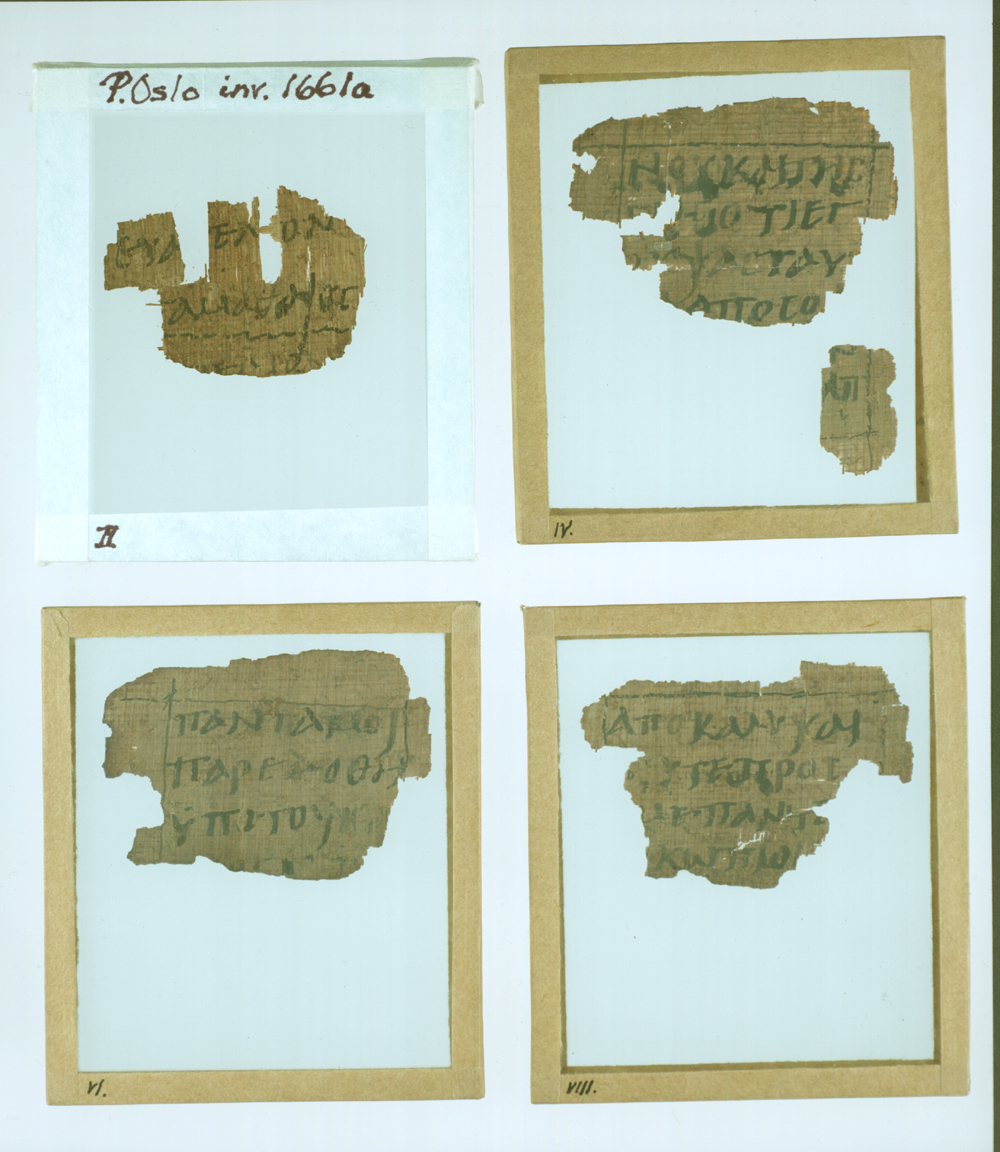
Matthew 11:25-30 from Papyrus 62

Matthew 11:25

και συνετων (and intelligent) – omitted by syr^{s,c} Hilary Augustine^{vid}

Matthew 11:25

εκρυψας – 𝔓^{62}, Sinaiticus, B, D, 33, ℓ 2211
απεκρυψας – C L W Θ f^{1,13} Byz

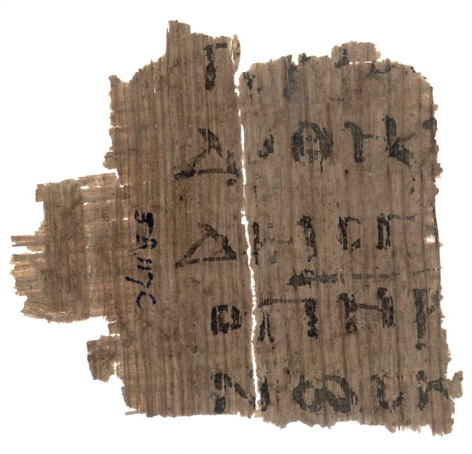
Matthew 11:26-27 from Papyrus 70

Matthew 11:27

του πατρος (the father) – א* cop^{sa^{ms},bo} Justin Marcosians
του πατρος μου (my father) – rell

Matthew 11:27

ουδεις επιγινωσκει τον πατερα ει μη ο υιος ουδε τον υιον ει μη ο πατηρ (no one intimately knows the father except the son, nor the son except the father) – N X Diatessaron^{(syr),arm} Marcus Justin Irenaeus^{pt} Eusebius^{(pt)} (Ephraem) Adamantius (Marcellus) Didymus^{pt} (Pseudo-Clementines) Epiphanius^{(pt)} Severian (John)
ουδεις επιγινωσκει τις εστιν ο υιος ει μη ο πατηρ ουδε τον πατερα τις επιγινωσκει ει μη ο υιος (no one intimately knows someone is the son except the father, nor the father someone intimately knows except the son) – 1010
ουδεις επιγινωσκει τον υιον ει μη ο πατηρ ουδε τον πατερα τις επιγινωσκει (no one intimately knows the son except the father, nor the father someone intimately knows) – 1505*
ουδεις επιγινωσκει τον υιον ει μη ο πατηρ ουδε τον πατερα τις επιγινωσκει ει μη ο υιος (no one intimately knows the son except the father, nor the father [does] someone intimately know except the son) – rell

Matthew 11:29

μαθετε (learn) – א* 245 1010
μαθετε απ’ εμου (learn from me) – rell

27 Textual variants in Matthew 12

Matthew 12:1

σταχυας και ταις χερσιν αυτων ψωχειν (grain heads and rubbing them with their hands) – it^{(c)} syr^{c}
σταχυας (grain heads) – rell

Matthew 12:2

τι οι μαθηται σου (Why do your disciples) – it^{(c)} syr^{s,c}
ιδου οι μαθηται σου (Look, your disciples) – rell

Matthew 12:2

εν σαββατω (on a Sabbath) — omitted by it^{ff^{1},k} syr^{s,c}

Matthew 12:4

ελαβεν (he took) – 892* Ambrosiaster
εφαγον (they ate) – א B 481
εφαγεν (he ate) – rell

Matthew 12:4

ο ουκ εξον ην (which was not permissible) – 𝔓^{70} B D W ƒ^{13} 22 it^{aur,ff^{2*},k,q} syr^{p} arm
ους ουκ εξον ην (which^{pl} was not permissible) – א C E G K L Θ 0233 ƒ^{1} (33) 565 892 𝔐 Lect lat syr^{h} cop

Matthew 12:4

αλλ’ η τοις ιερευσιν (but rather the priests) – ƒ^{1} 22
ει μη τοις ιερευσιν μονοις (except the chief priests alone) – rell

Matthew 12:9

εκειθεν ο Ιησους (from there, Jesus) – C N Σ it^{c,g^{1},h} syr^{p}
εκειθεν (from there) – rell

Matthew 12:10

τοις σαββασιν θεραπευσαι (to heal on the Sabbaths) – omitted by syr^{s}

Matthew 12:12

μαλλον διαφερει (more valuable) – Θ ƒ^{13} 33 157 517 565 713 1424 1675 lat syr^{s,c} cop^{mae}
διαφερει (better) – rell

Matthew 12:13

απεκατεσταθη υγιης (it was restored healthy) – א C^{c} 892*
απεκατεσταθη ως η αλλη (it was restored, like the other) – it^{b,c,ff^{1},g^{1}h} syr^{s,c,p} arm
απεκατεσταθη η χειρ αυτου υγιης ως η αλλη (his hand was restored, healthy like the other) – 118 209 983 1424 1689 𝑙^{184}
απεκατεσταθη υγιης ως η αλλη (it was restored, healthy like the other) – rell

Matthew 12:15

πολλοι (many) – א B Π^{c} 372 873 lat syr^{(s),(c)} eth^{mss} Eusebius^{pt} (Chromatius) Jerome Augustine
οχλοι (crowds) – N* cop^{sa^{mss}}
πολλοι οχλοι (many crowds) – X 0211 0233 1194 2680 eth^{mss} Hilary
οχλοι πολλοι (many crowds) – C D E G K L N^{c} W Δ Θ Π* Σ 0281 ƒ^{1} ƒ^{13} 28 33 157 180 205 565 579 700 892 1006 1009 1010 1071 1079 1195 1216 1230 1242 1243 1253 1292 1342 1344 1365 1424 1505 1546 1646 2148 2174 𝔐 Lect it^{d,f,h,(q)} syr^{p,h} cop^{sa^{ms},bo} arm eth^{(mss)} geo slav Diatessaron Origen Eusebius^{pt} (Hilary) Chrysostom

Matthew 12:16

και επετιμα αυτοις (And he was reprimanding them) – Θ
δε ους εθεραπευσεν επεπληξεν αυτοις (But whoever he healed, he rebuked) – D ƒ^{(1)} it
δε ους εθεραπευσεν επεπληξεν αυτοις και επετιμησεν αυτοις (But whoever he healed, he rebuked them and reprimanded them) – W
και επετιμησεν αυτοις (And he reprimanded them) – rell

Matthew 12:22

ωστε τον κωφον (so that the deaf-mute) – א B D 892 983 1424 it^{ff^{1},g^{1},k} syr^{s,c} cop
ωοτε τον κωφον και τυφλον (so that the deaf-mute and blind) – L W X Δ Θ 0233 ƒ^{1} ƒ^{13} 517 700 713 𝑙^{844} 𝑙^{2211} syr^{p,h} Basil
ωστε τον τυφλον και κωφον (so that the blind and deaf-mute) – C 0281 22 33 565 𝔐 Lect it^{q}
text omitted – lat

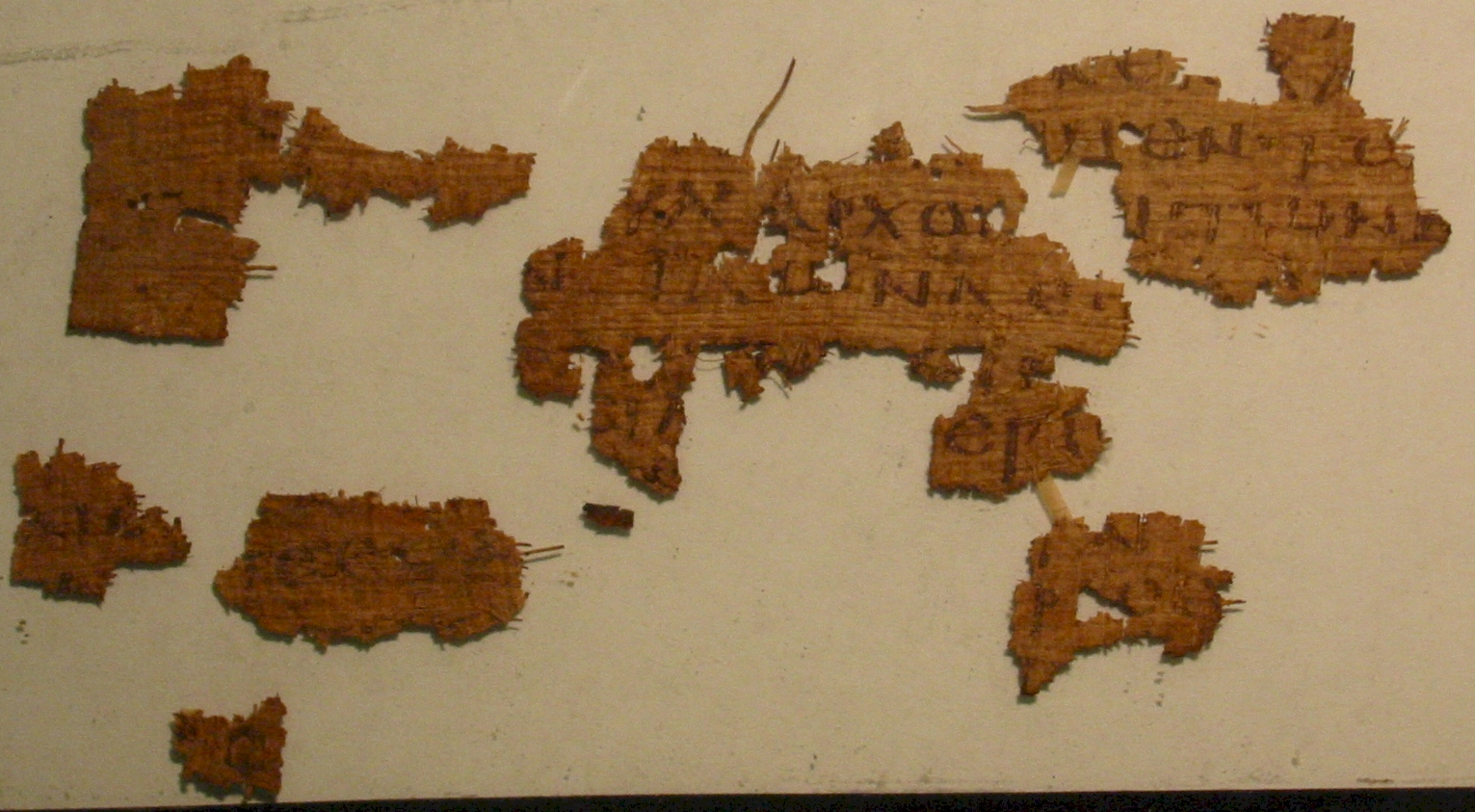
Matthew 12:24-26 from Papyrus 21

Matthew 12:24 (also Matthew 12:27)

Βεεζεβουλ (Beezeboul) — א B
Belzebul — it^{d}
Beelzebub or Baalzebub — it^{c,(ff^{1})} vg syr^{s,c,p}
Βεελζεβουλ (Beelzeboul) — 𝔓^{21} C (D) (L) W Θ 0281 ƒ^{1} ƒ^{13} 33 𝔐/Byz Lect it^{mss} syr^{h} (cop) Origen

Matthew 12:25

ο Ιησους (Jesus) — omitted by 𝔓^{21} א B D 892* 𝑙^{387} it^{d,(k)} syr^{s,c} cop^{sa,bo^{mss}} slav^{mss} Chrysostom^{pt}

Matthew 12:29

διαρπασαι (plunders) – א C^{c} D L Θ ƒ^{13} 𝔐 Lect syr^{c}
αρπασαι (seizes) – B C* N W ƒ^{1} 892 1424

Matthew 12:30

σκορπιζει (is scattering) – B C D K L W X Δ Θ Π ƒ^{1} ƒ^{13} 28 565 700 892 1009 1010 1071 1079 1195 1216 1230 1242 1253 1344 1365 1546 1582^{c} 1646 2148 2174 𝔐 Lect lat syr cop^{sa} arm geo
σκορπιζει με (is scattering me) – א 33 1582* syr^{h^{mg}} cop^{bo} eth Origen Athanasius Chrysostom
διαρπαστω (is plundering) – 𝑙^{185}
omit text – it^{k}

Matthew 12:31

βλασφημια αφεθησεται υμιν τοις ανθρωποις (blasphemy will be forgiven to you^{pl} by men) – B ƒ^{1} 22 syr^{pal^{mss}} cop^{sa,mae-1} Origen Athanasius
βλασφημια αφεθησεται αυτοις τοις ανθρωποις (blasphemy will be forgiven to them by men) – eth^{mss}
βλασφημια αφεθησεται (blasphemy will be forgiven) – syr^{pal^{mss}}
βλασφημια αφεθησεται τοις ανθρωποις (blasphemy will be forgiven to men) – rell

Matthew 12:31

ουκ αφεθησεται (will not be forgiven) – א B ƒ^{1} 22 174 517 892 1424 1675 it^{aur,k} vg cop^{sa,bo,mae-2}
ουκ αφεθησεται αυτω (will not be forgiven to him) – it^{(b),ff^{1},h} syr^{s,c} cop^{bo^{ms},mae-1}
ουκ αφεθησεται τοις ανθρωποις (will not be forgiven to men) – C D L W Θ 0271 ƒ^{13} 33 𝔐 Lect it^{mss} syr^{p,h}

Matthew 12:32

κατα του υιου του ανθρωπου ουκ αφεθησεται αυτω (against the Son of Man, it will not be forgiven to him) – B*
κατα του υιου του ανθρωπου αφεθησεται αυτω (against the Son of Man, it will be forgiven to him) – rell

Matthew 12:32

κατα του πνευματος του αγιου ου μη αφεθησεται αυτω (against the Holy Spirit, it will not in any way be forgiven to him) – א*
κατα του πνευματος του αγιου ου μη αφεθη αυτω (against the Holy Spirit, may it not in any way be forgiven to him) – B
κατα του πνευματος του αγιου ουκ αφεθησεται αυτω (against the Holy Spirit, it will not be forgiven to him) – rell

Matthew 12:34

το στομα λαλει αγαθα (the mouth is speaking good things) – D* it^{d}
το στομα λαλει (the mouth is speaking) – rell

Matthew 12:35

εκ του αγαθου θησαυρου της καρδιας αυτου (out of the good treasure of his heart) – L ƒ^{1} 33 it^{aur,(f)} vg^{mss} syr^{(s),(c)}
εκ του αγαθου θησαυρου (out of his good treasure) – rell

Matthew 12:38

και Φαρισαιων (and of the Pharisees) – omitted by B

Matthew 12:44

ευρισκει τον οικον (he finds the house) – D syr^{h^{(mg)}}
ευρισκει αυτον (he finds it) – it^{c,ff^{2},h} vg^{mss} cop^{mae}
ευρισκει (he finds) – rell

Matthew 12:46

ζητουντες αυτω λαλησαι (seeking to speak to him) – omitted by א*

Matthew 12:47

verse omitted — א* B L Γ 579 597 1009 𝑙^{12} 𝑙^{387} it^{ff^{1},k} syr^{s,c} cop^{sa,mae-2}

34 Textual variants in Matthew 13

Matthew 13:1

της οικιας (of the house) – B Θ ƒ^{1} ƒ^{13} 7 124 164 335 517 788 805 939 1201 1266 1424 1443 1554 1555 1651 1675 1823* 2487 2555 2586 Origen
εκ της οικιας (out of the house) – א Z 33 295 494 892 1342 1695 it^{c,f,h,l,q} vg
απο της οικιας (out from the house) – C E F G K L W Y Π 22 28 565 𝔐
text omitted – D it^{a,b,d,e,k,g^{1},ff^{1},ff^{2},g^{1},k} syr^{s}

Matthew 13:4

ηλθεν τα πετεινα και (the birds came^{sg} and) – א C W f^{1} 𝔐
ηλθον τα πετεινα και (the birds came^{pl} and) – D L Z 33 565
ελθοντα τα πετεινα (upon coming, the birds) – B
ελθοντα τα πετεινα του ουρανου (upon coming, the birds of the sky) – K Θ f^{13} 565 1010 1241 1424 it^{b,ff^{1},h} vg^{mss} syr^{c,h} cop^{sa,bo^{(mss)},mae} Origen

Matthew 13:6

βαθος ριζης (depth of root) – Θ f^{13}
ριζαν (root) – rell

Matthew 13:6

εξηρανθησαν (they were parched) – D syr^{h}
εξηρανθη (it was parched) – rell

Matthew 13:9

ο εχων ωτα ακουετω (The one having ears must listen) – א* B L it^{a,e,ff^{1},k} syr^{s} Tertullian
ο εχων ωτα ακουειν ακουετω (The one having ears to hear must listen) – rell

Matthew 13:11

το μυστηριον (the mystery) – it^{a,c,ff^{2},k} syr^{s,c} Irenaeus^{lat} Clement
τα μυστηρια (the mysteries) – rell

Matthew 13:13

ινα βλεποντες μη βλεπωσιν και ακουοντες μη ακουωσιν και μη συνιωσιν μηποτε επιστρεψωσιν (so that while seeing they may not be seeing, and while hearing they may not be hearing, and they may not be understanding, lest they would turn back) – D Θ f^{1} f^{13} 22 it^{mss} syr^{s,c} Arab^{ms}
ινα βλεποντες μη βλεπωσιν και ακουοντες μη ακουωσιν μηποτε επιστρεψωσιν και ιασομαι αυτους (so that while seeing they may not be seeing, and while hearing they may not be hearing, lest they would turn back and I would be healing them) – it^{h} Eusebius
ινα βλεποντες μη βλεπωσιν και ακουοντες μη ακουσωσιν μηδε συνωσιν (so that while seeing they may not be seeing, and while hearing they may not be hearing, nor would they be understanding) – 1424 it^{ff^{1}} cop^{sa,mae}
et aures eorum obstrue, et oculos corum grava, ne quando convertantur (and ) – it^{b,c,d,(e),ff^{2*},g^{1},k}
Text omitted – Codex Schøyen
οτι βλεποντες ου βλεπουσιν και ακουοντες ουκ ακουουσιν ουδε συνιουσιν (that while seeing they are not seeing, and while hearing they are not hearing, nor are they understanding) – rell

Matthew 13:14

λεγουσα πορευθητι και ειπε τω λαω τουτω ακοη (saying, "Go and say to this people, Hearing....) – D it cop^{mae} Eusebius
λεγουσα ακοη (saying, "Hearing....) – rell

Matthew 13:17

και ουκ ηδυνηθησαν ιδειν (and they were not able to see) – D
και ουκ ειδαν (and they did not see) – rell

Matthew 13:19

τον λογον εσπαρμενον (the message sown) – syr^{p} cop^{mae}
το σπειρομενον (what is being sown) – D W
το εσπαρμενον (what has been sown) – rell

Matthew 13:21

ουκ εχει δε ριζαν εν (But he does not have root within) – syr^{c}
ουκ εχει δε ριζαν εν αυτω (But it does not have root in him) – L Δ syr^{s,p,h}
ουκ εχει δε ριζαν εν εαυτω (But he does not have root in himself) – rell

Matthew 13:22

η μεριμνα του αιωνος (the concern of the world) – א* B D it^{a,d,e,ff^{2},g^{1},h,k} cop^{sa^{ms}}
η μεριμνα του αιωνος εκεινων (the concern of that world) – it^{c,ff^{1},l} vg^{mss}
η μεριμνα του αιωνος τουτου (the concern of this world) – rell

Matthew 13:23

και καρποφορει (and bears fruit) – vg syr^{c,p} cop^{mae}
τοτε καρποφορει (then bears fruit) – D it^{mss}
και τοτε καρποφορει (and then bears fruit) – it^{k*} syr^{s}
ος δη καρποφορει (who indeed bears fruit) – rell

Matthew 13:28

δουλοι (servants) – omitted by B 157 1424 it^{g^{2},h} cop Eusebius

Matthew 13:31

ελαλησεν (he spoke) – D L* N O Σ Θ ƒ^{13} 1 517 1424 1582 1675 it^{a,b,c,d,e,f,ff^{2},h,k,q} syr^{(s),(c)}
παρεθηκεν (he propounded) – rell

Matthew 13:32

δενδρον μεγα (a great tree) – syr^{p^{(ms)}} cop^{sa} eth geo^{B}
δενδρον (a tree) – rell

Matthew 13:33

ελαλησεν αυτοις (he spoke to them) – B W 0233 0242^{vid} ƒ^{1} 33 𝔐 lat syr^{p} cop^{bo}
ελαλησεν αυτοις λεγων (he spoke to them, saying) – א L M U X Θ ƒ^{13} 28 157 it^{h,(l),q} vg^{mss} cop^{sa^{ms}} mae
παρεθηκεν αυτοις λεγων (he propounded to them, saying) – C 1241 cop^{sa^{mss}}
omitted by – D it^{d,(k)} syr^{s,c} Codex Schøyen

Matthew 13:35

δια Ησαιου του προφητου (through Isaiah the prophet) – א* Θ ƒ^{1} ƒ^{13} 33 713 vg^{ms} eth^{ms} Pseudo-Clement Porphyrius Eusebius^{mss} Jerome^{mss}
δια Ασαφ του προφητου (through Asaph the prophet) – Jerome^{mss}
δια του προφητου (through the prophet) – rell

Matthew 13:35

απο καταβολης (from the foundation) – א^{1} B ƒ^{1} 22 279* 1192 1210 2586 it^{e,k} syr^{(s),(c)} eth Diatessaron Origen Eusebius Jerome^{pt}
απο καταβολης κοσμου (from the foundation of the world) – א^{*,2} C D E F G K L O W X Δ Θ Π Σ 0233 ƒ^{13} 28 33 157 180 205 565 579 597 700 892 1006 1009 1010 1071 1079 1195 1216 1230 1241 1242 1243 1253 1292 1342 1344 1365 1424 1505 1546 1646 2148 2174 𝔐 Lect lat syr^{(p),h} cop arm geo slav Clement Pseudo-Clement Eusebius Hilary Chrysostom^{lem} Jerome^{pt} Hesychius

Matthew 13:36

ηλθεν εις την οικιαν αυτου (he came into his house) – ƒ^{1} 1424 1675 arm^{mss} Origen
ηλθεν εις την οικιαν ο Ιησους (Jesus came into the house) – C L W Θ 0233 ƒ^{13} 𝔐 it^{f,h,q} syr^{(p),h}
ηλθεν εις την οικιαν (he came into the house) – א B D vg syr^{s,c} cop

Matthew 13:36

φρασον (declare) – א^{c} C D L W 0106 0233 0250 ƒ^{1} ƒ^{13} 𝔐 it Origen
διασαφησον (explain) – א* B Θ 0242 1424 vg

Matthew 13:40

τη συντελεια του αιωνος τουτου (the consummation of this age) – C K L P W X Δ Θ Π 0106 0233 0242 0250 ƒ^{13} 28 33 565 579 700 1009 1010 1071 1079 1195 1216 1230 1241 1242 1253 1344 1365 1546 1646 2148 2174 𝔐 Lect it^{f,h,q} syr^{p,h} cop^{sa^{(ms)},bo,fay} geo Diatessaron Chrysostom
τη συντελεια του αιωνος (the consummation of the age) – א B D Γ ƒ^{1} 22 372 892 1582 2737 lat syr^{s,c} cop^{sa,mae} arm eth Irenaeus^{lat} Origen Hilary Lucifer Cyril

Matthew 13:43

ωτα (ears) – א* B Θ 0242 700 it^{a,b,e,k} vg^{mss} Hilary Augustine
ωτα ακουειν (ears to hear) – א^{c} C D E F G K L N O P W X Δ Π Σ 0106 0233 0250 ƒ^{1} ƒ^{13} 28 33 157 180 205 565 579 597 892 1006 1009 1010 1071 1079 1195 1216 1230 1241 1242 1243 1253 1292 1342 1344 1365 1424 1505 1546 2148 2174 𝔐 Lect lat syr cop arm eth geo slav Diatessaron^{arm} Origen Eusebius Hilary Chromatius Pelagius
Text omitted – 𝑙^{387}

Matthew 13:44

παλιν ομοια εστιν η βασιλεια των ουρανων (Again, the kingdom of heaven is like) – C L W Θ 0106 0233 0250 ƒ^{1} ƒ^{13} 𝔐 it^{f,h,q} syr^{p,h} Origen
ομοια εστιν η βασιλεια των ουρανων (The kingdom of heaven is like) – א B D Θ 0242 892 1241 lat syr^{s,c} cop

Matthew 13:44

εν τω αγρω (in the countryside) – omitted by א

Matthew 13:44

οσα εχει πωλει (what he has, he sells) – 28
και πωλει οσα εχει (and he sells what he has) – B 1216 cop^{bo} Origen
και πωλει παντα οσα εχει (and he sells all that he has) – א D 0242 ƒ^{1} (892) 1009 1079 1546 lat syr^{(s),(c),(p),(pal)} cop^{sa,mae,fay} arm eth^{pt} geo Chrysostom
και παντα οσα εχει πωλει (and all that he has, he sells) – C K L P W X Δ Θ Π 0106 0233 0250 ƒ^{13} 22 33 157 372 565 579 700 1010 1071 1195 1230 1241 1242 1344 1365 1646 2148 2174 2737 𝔐 Lect it^{f,q} syr^{h,pal^{ms}} eth^{pt}

Matthew 13:45

ανθρωπω εμπορω (merchant man) – א^{c} C D L W Θ 0106 0233 0242 0250 ƒ^{1} ƒ^{13} 𝔐
εμπορω (merchant) – א* B Γ 1424

Matthew 13:46

ος ευρων (who, upon finding) – C W 0106 0250 ƒ^{13} 𝔐 syr^{h}
ευρων δε (Then, upon finding) – א B D L Θ 0233 0242 ƒ^{1} 33 892 syr^{p} cop

Matthew 13:51

λεγει αυτοις ο Ιησους συνηκατε (Jesus says to them, "Do you understand") – C L W X Δ Θ 0137 0233 ƒ^{1} ƒ^{13} 22 33 372 892 2737 𝔐 it^{(a),f,h,q} vg^{mss} syr^{(c),(p),h} cop^{bo^{(mss)},(mae)}
συνηκατε (Do you understand) – א B D 1010 lat syr^{s} cop^{sa,bo^{mss}}

Matthew 13:51

Ναι κυριε (Yes sir.) – C L W X Δ 0137 0233 22 33 892 𝔐 it^{b,c,e,f,g^{1},h,q} syr^{p,h} cop
Ναι (Yes.) – א B D Θ ƒ^{1} ƒ^{13} 372 517 1424 1675 2737 lat syr^{s,c}

Matthew 13:54

Αντιπατριδα (Antipatris) – א*
πατριδα (homeland) – rell

Matthew 13:54

και δυναμεις (and abilities) – 579 700
Text omitted – ƒ^{1} (Origen)
και αι δυναμεις (and these abilities) – rell

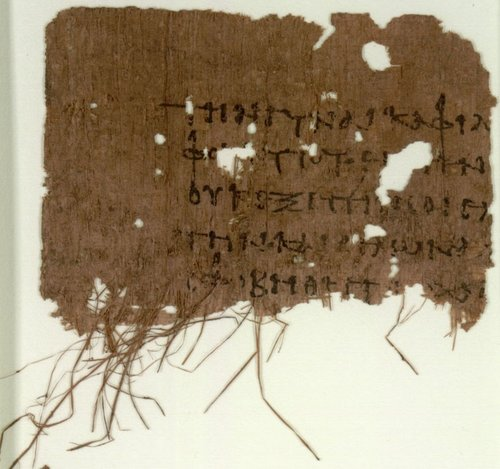
Matthew 13:55-56 from Papyrus 103

Matthew 13:55

Ιακωβος και Ιωση και Σιμων (Jacob and Jose and Simon) – S^{c} 118 157 700* 713 1009 1010 1071 𝑙^{70} cop^{bo^{(mss)}}
Ιακωβος και Ιωσης και Σιμων (Jacob and Joses and Simon) – K L W Δ Π 0106 ƒ^{13} 22 180 205 372 565 597 1079 1195 1216 1230 1241 1242 1253 1342 1365 1546 1582^{mg} 1646 2148 2174 2737 𝔐^{pt} Lect^{pt} it^{k,q^{(c)}} cop^{sa,bo^{(mss)},fay} arm eth^{pt} slav^{mss} Diatessaron Basil
Ιακωβος και Ιωσηφ και Σιμων (Jacob and Joseph and Simon) – א^{c} B C N O Θ Σ ƒ^{1} 13 33 700^{c} 892 l184 l387 l997 lat syr^{s,c,h^{(mg)},pal} cop^{bo^{(mss)},mae} eth^{pt} geo slav^{mss} Origen^{pt} Eusebius Basil Jerome Augustine
Ιακωβος και Ιωαννης και Ιωσης και Σιμων (Jacob and John and Joses and Simon) – 1344 vg^{mss}
Ιακωβος και Ιωαννης και Σιμων (Jacob and John and Simon) – 𝔓^{103}^{vid} א*^{vid} D E G M U X Γ 2 28 579 1424 1505 𝔐^{pt} Lect^{pt} it^{d} vg^{mss} Origen^{pt}

Matthew 13:57

εν τη πατριδι αυτου (in his homeland) – E G K L W Y Π 0106 ƒ^{1} 28 565 𝔐
εν τη ιδια πατριδι (in their own homeland) – א Z ƒ^{13} 892 Origen^{pt}
εν τη ιδια πατριδι αυτου (in his own homeland) – C
εν τη πατριδι (in the homeland) – B D Θ 0281 33 700 1424 it^{a,k} Origen^{pt}

15 Textual variants in Matthew 14

Matthew 14:3

Ηρωδης κρατησας (Herod apprehended) – א C D K L W X Δ Π ƒ^{1} 28 33 565 892 1009 1071 1079 1195 1216 1230 1241 1242 1253 1344 1365 1546 1646 2148 2174 𝔐 Lect lat syr cop^{bo,fay} arm eth geo^{mss} Diatessaron
Ηρωδης τοτε κρατησας (Herod at that time apprehended) – B Θ ƒ^{13} 160 569 700 1010 1293 1295 1306 1310 1604 2831 it^{k} cop^{sa,mae-1} geo^{mss} Arab^{ms}

Matthew 14:3

εδησεν αυτον (bound him) – א^{2} C D E G K L W Y Z Θ Π 0106 ƒ^{1} ƒ^{13} 33 372 565 892 2737 𝔐 lat syr cop
εδησεν (bound) – א* B 700 𝑙^{2211} it^{ff^{1},h,q} cop^{bo^{(mss)}} geo^{ms}

Matthew 14:3

εν τη φυλακη (into prison) – D it^{a,e,k}
εν τη φυλακη και απεθετο (into prison and put away) – א^{2}
και εθετο εν φυλακη (and put in prison) – C L W 0106* 𝔐 syr^{h}
και απεθετο εν τη φυλακη (and put away into prison) – ƒ^{1} 700
και εν τη φυλακη απεθετο (and put away into prison) – B^{2} Θ 892
και εν φυλακη απεθετο (and put away in prison) – א* B* ƒ^{13} 33 1424 it^{ff^{1},h}

Matthew 14:3

Φιλιππου (of Philip) – omitted by D 372 2737 it^{a,c,d,e,ff^{1},g^{1},k,l} vg^{mss} Diatessaron^{arm} Jerome Augustine

Matthew 14:6

γενεσιων αγομενων (birthday celebration being conducted) – W 0106 0136 ƒ^{13} 𝔐
γενεσιων γενομενων (birthday celebration was happening) – C K N Θ 565 892 1241 1424
γενεσιοις γενομενοις (birthday celebrations were happening) – א B D L Z ƒ^{(1)} 1010

Matthew 14:12

σωμα (body) – W X Γ Δ Π Φ 0106 0136 28 𝔐 lat syr^{h} cop^{sa,bo^{(mss)},mae}
πτωμα (corpse) – א B C D L Θ ƒ^{1} ƒ^{13} 33 565 700 892 1010 1241 1424 it^{e,k} syr^{s,c,p} cop^{bo^{mss}}

Matthew 14:14

ειδεν (he saw) – it^{a,b,ff^{2}} syr^{s,c}
εξελθων ο Ιησους ειδεν (Jesus saw coming forth) – C (L) W 067 0106^{vid} 𝔐 it^{f,h,q} syr^{p,h}
εξελθων ειδεν (he saw coming forth) – א B D Θ ƒ^{1} ƒ^{13} 33 700 892* vg cop

Matthew 14:16

Ιησους (Jesus) – omitted by א* D Z^{vid} 1424 it^{e,k} syr^{s,c,p} cop^{sa,bo}

Matthew 14:22

ευθεως (immediately) – omitted by א* C* 892* it^{(ms)} syr^{s,c} Diatessaron Chrysostom

Matthew 14:24

σταδιους πολλους απο της γης απειχεν (was being constrained many stadia away from the land) – B cop^{(sa),mae-2} Diatessaron
σταδιους πολλους απο απειχεν (was being constrained many stadia away) – ƒ^{13}
απειχεν απο της γης σταδιους ικανους (was being constrained a considerable number of stadia away from the land) – Θ (700) syr^{c,p,pal} arm
απειχεν απο της γης σταδιους ως εικοσι πεντε (was being constrained about twenty-five stadia away from the land) – cop^{bo,mae-1} eth^{pt}
εκινδυνευεν ηδη μεσον της θαλασσης (was being endangered then at mid-sea) – 1546
ην εις μεσον της θαλασσης (was into the midst of the sea) – D (1424) it^{d,e,ff^{1}} (Eusebius)
μεσον της θαλασσης ην (was mid-sea) – א C E F G (K) L P W X Y Δ Π Σ 073 084 0106 ƒ^{1} 28 33 157 180 205 565 579 597 892 1006 1009 1010 1071 1079 1195 1216 1230 1241 1242 1243 1253 1292 1342 1344 1365 1505 1646 2148 2174 𝔐 Lect lat syr^{h} slav eth^{pt} Origen Chrysostom^{lem} Chromatius Jerome Augustine

Matthew 14:26

και ιδοντες αυτον οι μαθηται (And upon seeing him, the disciples) – C E F G K L W Y Π 0106 28 33 565 892 𝔐 syr^{h} cop^{bo^{pt}}
και ιδοντες αυτον (And upon seeing him) – 073 084 ƒ^{1} 1241 1424 it^{c,l} vg cop^{bo^{pt}}
οι δε μαθηται ιδοντες αυτον (But the disciples, upon seeing him) – א^{1} B D ƒ^{13} cop^{mae}
ιδοντες δε αυτον (But upon seeing him) – א* Θ 700 it^{a,b,e,ff^{1},ff^{2},g^{1},h,q} cop^{sa}

Matthew 14:27

ο Ιησους (Jesus) – omitted by א* D 084 892 1010 it^{d,ff^{1}} syr^{c} cop^{sa,bo} Eusebius

Matthew 14:30

ανεμον ισχυρον σφοδρα (exceedingly strong wind) – W cop^{(mae)}
ανεμον ισχυρον (strong wind) – B^{2} C D E F G K L P W X (Y) Δ Θ Π Σ 0106 ƒ^{1} ƒ^{13} 28 157 180 205 565 579 597 700 892 1006 1009 1010 1071 1079 1195 1216 1230 1241 1242 1243 1253 1292 1342 1344 1365 1424 1505 1546 1646 2148 2174 𝔐 Lect lat syr cop^{(mae)} arm eth geo slav Origen Basil Gaudentius Chrysostom Chromatius Jerome Augustine
ανεμον (wind) – א B* 073 33 vg^{ms} cop^{sa,bo,mae-2}

Matthew 14:32

εμβαντι αυτω (when he was embarking) – 1241 it syr^{c} cop^{sa^{ms},bo,mae}
εμβαντων αυτων (as they were embarking) – C L W 0106 ƒ^{1} 𝔐
αναβαντων αυτων (as they were climbing up) – א B D Θ 084 ƒ^{13} 33 700 892 1424

Matthew 14:33

εν τω πλοιω προσελθοντες (they were drawing near unto the boat) – Θ ƒ^{13} 1424 syr^{s,c}
εν τω πλοιω ελθοντες (they were coming into the boat) – D L P W X Δ 0106 33 372 2737 𝔐 lat syr^{p,h} cop^{mae-1}
εν τω πλοιω οντες (while being in the boat) – 28 118 209 cop^{sa}
εν τω πλοιω (in the boat) – א B C N ƒ^{1} 22 579 700 892* 1010 it^{ff^{1}} cop^{bo}

18 Textual variants in Matthew 15

Matthew 15:4

ο γαρ θεος ενετειλατο λεγων (For God commanded, saying) — א^{*,2} C E F G K L N W X Y Δ Π Σ 0106 13 22 33 157 180 205 565 597 828 1006 1009 1010 1071 1079 1195 1216 1230 1241 1242 1243 1253 1292 1342 1344 1365 1424 1505 1546 1646 2148 2174 𝔐 Lect it^{f} syr^{h} slav (Chrysostom)
ο γαρ θεος ειπεν (For God said) — א^{1} B D Θ 073 084 ƒ^{1} 124 579 700 788 892 Lat syr^{s,c,p} cop arm eth geo Diatessaron Ptolemy Irenaeus^{lat} Origen Ambrosiaster Amphilochius Chromatius Jerome Augustine Cyril

Matthew 15:6

τον πατερα η την μητερα αυτου (father or his mother) — Θ ƒ^{1} 205 (1216) 1424 𝑙^{184} 𝑙^{1152} geo^{mss} slav Diatessaron^{(arm)} Origen^{pt} Ambrosiaster
τον πατερα αυτου η την μητερα (his father or mother) — 073 084 ƒ^{13} 33 579 700 892 1071 1505 𝑙^{(1761)} it^{ff^{2},g^{1},l} vg^{mss} Chrysostom Jerome Cyril^{pt}
τον πατερα αυτου η την μητερα αυτου (his father or his mother) — C E F G K L N W X Δ Π Σ 0106 0233 157 180 372 597 1006 1009 1010 1079 1195 1230 1242 1243 1253 1292 1342 1344 1365 (1546) 1646 2148 2174 2737 𝔐 Lect it^{aur,f,ff^{1}} vg^{mss} syr^{p,h} (arm) eth Diatessaron^{syr} Origen^{pt} Chromatius Cyril^{pt}
τον πατερα αυτου και την μητερα αυτου (his father and his mother) — Φ 565 1241 it^{(b),c,q} syr^{s} cop^{bo,mae-1} geo^{mss}
τον πατερα αυτου (his father) — א B D Ω it^{a,d,e} syr^{c} cop^{sa} geo^{mss} Origen^{lat} Augustine
Text omitted — Codex Schøyen

Matthew 15:6

την εντολην (the commandment) — E F G K L N W X Y (Δ) Π Σ Φ 0106 0233 ƒ^{1} 22 33 157 180 205 372 565 597 1006 1009 1071 1079 1195 1216 1241 1242 1243 1253 1292 1342 1344 1365 1424 1505 1546 1582 1646 2148 2174 2737 2786 𝔐 Lect it^{aur,c,f,g^{1},l,q} vg syr^{h} cop^{mae-2} geo^{mss} Origen^{pt} Didymus^{vid} Chrysostom Cyril
τον νομον (the law) — א^{*,2} C 073 084 ƒ^{13} 21 160 1010 1097* 1293 2766 geo^{mss} slav Ptolemy Epiphanius
τον λογον (the word) — א^{1} B D Θ 579 700 892 1230 1582^{mg} it^{a,b,d,e,ff^{1},(ff^{2})} syr^{s,c,p,h^{(mg)}} cop^{sa,bo,mae-1} arm eth geo^{mss} Diatessaron Irenaeus^{lat} Origen^{pt} Eusebius Chromatius Augustine

Matthew 15:8

εγγιζει μοι ο λαος ουτος τω στοματι αυτων και (This people is approaching me with their mouth, and) — C W X Δ 0106 ƒ^{13^{pt}} 𝔐 it^{f,q} syr^{h} Arab^{ms}
ο λαος ουτος εγγιζει μοι (This people is approaching me) — ƒ^{1}
ο λαος ουτος (This people) — א B D L Θ 073 084 ƒ^{13^{pt}} 33 124 372 579 700 788 892 1424 2737 lat syr^{s,c,p} cop Egerton Gospel Clement Origen Didymus

Matthew 15:11

κοινοι τον ανθρωπον (defiles the man) — 22 1241 it^{a,aur,e,ff^{1}} cop^{sa}
εκεινο κοινωνει τον ανθρωπον (that vulgarizes the man) — D
Text omitted — ƒ^{1} 124 1071 cop^{bo^{mss}} Origen
τουτο κοινοι τον ανθρωπον (this defiles the man) — rell

Matthew 15:14

τυφλοι εισιν (they are blind) — Codex Schøyen
τυφλοι εισιν οδηγοι (they are blind guides) — B D 0237 it^{d}
οδηγοι εισιν τυφλοι (they are blind guides) — א^{*,2} 𝑙^{(12)} cop^{sa,bo^{mss},fay^{vid}} Epiphanius
οδηγοι εισιν τυφλων (they are guides of the blind) — K syr^{s,c} eth^{ms}
οδηγοι εισιν τυφλοι τυφλων (they are blind guides of the blind) — C E F G N O W X Y Δ Π Σ 0106^{vid} 157 180 565 597 1006 1009 1010 1071 1079 1195 1230 1242 1243 1253 1292 1342 1344 1365 1505 1546 1646 (2148) 2174 𝔐 Lect it^{q} cop^{bo^{mss}} slav Chrysostom
τυφλοι εισιν οδηγοι τυφλων (they are blind guides of the blind) — א^{1} L Z Θ 0233 ƒ^{1} ƒ^{13} 22 33 205 372 579 700 892 1216 1241 1424 2737 lat syr^{p,h} cop^{bo^{mss},mae-1} arm eth^{mss} geo Origen Cyprian Basil Chromatius Jerome Augustine Cyril Theodoret

Matthew 15:14

τυφλος δε τυφλον οδηγων σφαλησεται και (But blind leading the blind will fall, and) — Θ ƒ^{13} cop^{mae}
τυφλος δε τυφλον εαν οδηγη (But if blind lead the blind) — rell

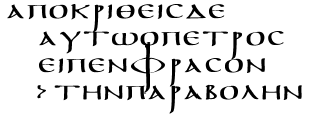
Matthew 15:15 in codex 0237; it may include the variant την παραβολην

Matthew 15:15

την παραβολην ταυτην (this parable) — C D E F G K L O W X Y (Δ) Θ Π Σ 0106 0119 0233 0281 22 33 157 180 205 372 565 597 1006 1009 1010 1071 1079 1195 1216 1230 1241 1242 1243 1253 1292 1342 1344 1365 1424 1505 1546 1646 2148 2174 2737 𝔐 Lect lat syr cop^{sa^{ms},mae-1} arm eth geo^{mss} slav Basil Chrysostom Jerome Augustine
ταυτην την παραβολην (this parable) — ƒ^{13}
την παραβολην (the parable) — א B Z^{vid} 0237^{vid} ƒ^{1} 579 700 892 vg^{mss} cop^{sa^{mss},bo} geo^{mss} Origen Chromatius Cyril

Matthew 15:16

Ιησους (Jesus) — omitted by א B D Z 33 892 1424 lat syr^{s,c,p} cop

Matthew 15:17

ουπω νοειτε (Do you not yet understand) — א C L W 0106 ƒ^{1} ƒ^{13^{pt}} 700 𝔐 it^{f,q} syr^{h} cop^{bo}
ου νοειτε (Do you not understand) — B D Z Θ ƒ^{13^{pt}} 33 565 lat syr^{s,c,p} cop^{sa,mae-1} Origen

Matthew 15:22

δεινως (terribly) — 1 1582 Origen
sævissime (furiously) — it^{a}
κακως (badly) — rell

Matthew 15:26

ουκ εξεστιν (It is not lawful) — D it^{a,b,c,d,ff^{1},ff^{2},g^{1},r^{1}} syr^{s,c} (Diatessaron) Ps-Clement Origen Ambrosiaster Hilary Basil Ambrose Jerome
ουκ εστιν (It is not) — 1293 Tertullian Eusebius
ουκ καλον εστιν (It is not right) — 544 1010 1365 𝑙^{309} geo
ουκ εστιν καλον (It is not right) — א B C K L W X Δ Θ Π ƒ^{1} ƒ^{13} 33 565 700 892 1009 1071 1079 1195 1216 1230 1241 1242 1253 1344 1546 1646 2148 2174 𝔐 Lect it^{aur,e,f,k,l,q} vg syr^{p,h} cop arm eth Origen Chrysostom

Matthew 15:30

κωφους (deaf-mute) — omitted by D

Matthew 15:30

του Ιησου (of Jesus) — C K P W Γ Δ ƒ^{1} 565 1010 1241 𝔐 it^{f,q} syr^{p,h}
αυτου (of him) — rell

Matthew 15:31

τον οχλον (the crowd) — א C D O U Δ Θ Π ƒ^{1} ƒ^{13} 33 579 700 892 1010 1241 1424
τους οχλους (the crowds) — B E F G K L W Y Π 565 𝔐 lat syr cop^{mae}

Matthew 15:31

κωφους λαλουντας και χωλους περιπατουντας και τυφλους βλεποντας (deaf-mute are speaking and lame are walking and blind are seeing) — א ƒ^{1} 22 700* 892 1241 𝑙^{184} lat syr^{s,c} eth^{mss} Origen Jerome Augustine
κωφους λαλουντας και χωλους περιπατουντας και τυφλους βλεποντας και κυλλους υγιεις (deaf-mute are speaking and lame are walking and blind are seeing and crippled are healed) — 579
κωφους λαλουντας χωλους περιπατουντας τυφλους βλεποντας δυσκωφους ακουοντας (mute are speaking, lame are walking, blind are seeing, deaf are hearing) — cop^{bo^{mss}} (geo)
κωφους λαλουντας και τυφλους βλεποντας και χωλους περιπατουντας (deaf-mute are speaking and blind are seeing and lame are walking) — 700*
κωφους λαλουντας και τυφλους βλεποντας και κυλλους υγιεις και χωλους περιπατουντας (deaf-mute are speaking and blind are seeing and crippled are healed and lame are walking) — 700^{c}
κωφους λαλουντας κυλλους υγιεις και χωλους περιπατουντας και τυφλους βλεποντας (deaf-mute are speaking, crippled are healed and lame are walking and blind are seeing) — C E F G H K L P W X Δ Π 0233 180 205 565 597 700^{(c)} 1006 1009 1010 1079 1195 1242 1292 1342 1344 1365 1505 1546 1646 2148 2174 𝔐 Lect^{pt} it^{(d),(f),(q)} cop^{mae} slav Chrysostom
κωφους λαλουντας και κυλλους υγιεις και χωλους περιπατουντας και τυφλους βλεποντας (deaf-mute are speaking and crippled are healed and lame are walking and blind are seeing) — D Θ ƒ^{13} 33 157 1230 1253 1424 𝑙^{76} syr^{p,h}
κωφους λαλουντας χωλους περιπατουντας κυλλους υγιεις τυφλους βλεποντας (deaf-mute are speaking, lame are walking, crippled are healed, blind are seeing) — arm
κωφους ακουοντας και χωλους περιπατουντας και τυφλους βλεποντας (deaf-mute are hearing and lame are walking and blind are seeing) — it^{e} eth^{mss}
κωφους ακουοντας κυλλους υγιεις και χωλους περιπατουντας και τυφλους βλεποντας (deaf-mute are hearing, crippled are healed and lame are walking and blind are seeing) — B Φ 1243 𝑙^{(211)} syr^{h^{mg}}
κωφους ακουοντας και λαλουντας κυλλους υγιεις και χωλους περιπατουντας και τυφλους βλεποντας (deaf-mute are hearing and speaking, crippled are healed and lame are walking and blind are seeing) — N O Σ
κωφους ακουοντας αλαλους λαλουντας κυλλους υγιεις και χωλους περιπατουντας και τυφλους βλεποντας (deaf-mute are hearing, speechless are speaking, crippled are healed and lame are walking and blind are seeing) — Lect^{pt}
αλαλους λαλουντας κωφους ακουοντας κυλλους υγιεις και χωλους περιπατουντας και τυφλους βλεποντας (speechless are speaking, deaf-mute are hearing, crippled are healed and lame are walking and blind are seeing) — 1071
χωλους περιπατουντας και κωφους λαλουντας τυφλους βλεποντας και κυλλους υγιεις (lame are walking and deaf-mute are speaking, blind are seeing and crippled are healed) — 1216 cop^{sa^{mss}}
χωλους περιπατουντας κυλλους υγιεις κωφους λαλουντας τυφλους βλεποντας (lame are walking, crippled are healed, deaf-mute are speaking, blind are seeing) — cop^{sa^{mss}}

Matthew 15:35

παραγγειλας τω οχλω (directing the crowd) — א B D Θ ƒ^{1} ƒ^{13} 33 892*
εκελευσεν τοις οχλοις (commanding the crowds) — L W 700 892^{c} 𝔐 syr
εκελευσεν τους οχλους (commanding the crowds) — C 1010 1424

Matthew 15:39

Μαγαδαν (Magadan) — א* B D it^{d}
Μαγεδαν (Magedan) — א^{c} Δ^{lat} it^{aur,c,f,ff^{1},g^{1}} vg syr^{s} cop^{(sa)} eth Eusebius Jerome Augustine
Μαγεδαμ (Magedam) — it^{a,b,e,ff^{2},l}
Μαγαδον (Magadon) — syr^{c}
Μαγαδιν (Magadin) — syr^{pal}
Μαγδυ (Magdu) — syr^{p}
Μαγεδαλ (Magedal) — eth^{mss}
Μαγδαλαν (Magdalan) — C M N O W Σ* 33 205 565 579 1079 1195 1546 𝑙^{5} 𝑙^{292} 𝑙^{514} 𝑙^{672} 𝑙^{(1074)} it^{q} cop^{mae-1,bo}
Μαγδαλα (Magdala) — E F G H K L X Δ^{gr} Θ Π Σ^{c} ƒ^{1} ƒ^{13} 22 157 180 372 597 700 892 1006 1009 1010 1071 1216 1230 1241 1242 1243 1253 1292 1342 1344 1365 1424 1505 1646 2174 2737 𝔐 Lect syr^{h} arm geo slav arab^{ms} Chrysostom

24 Textual variants in Matthew 16

Matthew 16:1

ηρωτησαν (they inquired) — א^{1} 892
ηρωτων (they were inquiring) — א^{2}
επηρωτων (they were questioning) — א* Θ ƒ^{1} ƒ^{13} 565 1241 1424
επηρωτησαν (they questioned) — rell

Matthew 16:2-3

οψιας γενομενης λεγετε ευδια πυρραζει γαρ ο ουρανος και πρωι σημερον χειμων πυρραζει γαρ στυγναζων ο ουρανος {Insert: υποκριται (Hypocrites!) in E H S Π Σ 372 565 700 2737 𝔐 it syr^{p} cop^{bo^{mss}} Diatessaron^{arab}} το μεν προσωπον του ουρανου γινωσκετε διακρινειν τα δε σημεια των καιρων ου δυνασθε (Come evening, you^{pl} say, 'Good weather' because the sky reddens, then at dawn, 'A storm today' because the sky reddens, becoming gloomy. Indeed, you^{pl} know to discern the appearance of the sky, but not able (to discern) the signs of the times) — C (D) F G H (K) L (N) O (W) Δ Θ ƒ^{1} 22 33 180 205 262 (579) 597 892 1006 1009 1010 1071 1079 1195 1230 1241 1242 1243 1253 1292 1342 1344 1365 1424 1505 1546 1646 2148 2174 Lect it^{d} vg syr^{h} eth geo slav Theophilus Juvencus Eusebius Hilary Apostolic Constitutions Chrysostom Jerome Augustine Euthalius
Text omitted — א B V X Y Γ 031 033 034 036 047 2* ƒ^{13} 34 39 44 84 151 157 180 194 272 274 344 376 445 539 563 595 661 699 776 777 780 788 792 826 828 852 1073 1074 1076 1078 1080 1216 1424^{mg} 2542 syr^{s,c} cop^{sa,bo^{mss},mae} arm Origen Jerome^{mss}

Matthew 16:4

και μοιχαλις (and adulterous) — omitted by D it

Matthew 16:4

σημειον αιτει και (asks for a sign, and) — B*
σημειον ζητει και (seeks a sign, and) — D Θ
text omitted — 700
σημειον επιζητει και (seeks after a sign, and) — B^{c} rell

Matthew 16:4

Ἰωνα του προφητου (of the prophet Jonah) — C W X Δ Θ ƒ^{1} ƒ^{13} 22 33 372 892 2737 𝔐 it^{a,b,c,e,f,ff^{2},q} vg^{mss} syr cop^{bo,mae}
Ἰωνα (of Jonah) — א B D L 579 700 it^{aur,d,ff^{1},g^{1},l} vg^{mss} cop^{sa} Justin

Matthew 16:5

οι μαθηται αυτου (his disciples) — K L W X Π ƒ^{1} 33 565 1009 1010 1071 1079 1195 1216 1230 1241 1242 1253 1344 1365 1546 1646 2148 2174 𝔐 Lect it^{(a),aur,(b),(c),f,ff^{(1)},ff^{(2)},g^{(1)},l,q} vg syr cop eth geo Diatessaron (Origen)
οι μαθηται (the disciples) — א B C (D) Θ ƒ^{13} (700) 892 𝑙^{184} it^{(d),(e)} cop^{sa^{(ms)}} arm
text omitted — Δ

Matthew 16:8

ελαβετε (you^{pl} took) — C E F G K L W X Y Δ Π ƒ^{1} 22 33 565 1009 1010 1071 1079 1195 1216 1230 1242 1253 1344 1424 1546 1646 2148 2174 𝔐 Lect it^{f} syr cop^{sa} Origen Eusebius Chrysostom
εχετε (you^{pl} have) — א B D Θ ƒ^{13} 372 579 700 892 1241 2737 lat cop^{bo,mae} arm geo^{mss} Diatessaron Lucifer
ελαβομεν (we took) — 1365 𝑙^{1579} geo^{mss}

Matthew 16:11

αρτου (a loaf of bread) — D W Γ Δ 𝔐^{pt} vg syr^{p,h} cop^{bo^{mss}}
αρτων (loaves of bread) — rell

Matthew 16:12

των αρτων (of the bread) — ƒ^{1} 517 1424 1478* 1675 it^{e} Origen
της ζυμης (of the leaven) — D Θ ƒ^{13} 124* 173 565 788 803 1058 1331 2145^{c} 2295 2315 it^{a,b,d,ff^{2}} syr^{s} cop^{mae-2} arm geo^{mss} Lucifer
της ζυμης των αρτων (of the leaven of the breads) — א^{2} B K* L 157 176 372 375^{(c)} 805 892 954 1009 1241 1273^{c} 1295^{c} 1446 1478^{c} 1500^{c} 2585 2605 2737 Lect^{pt} it^{aur,g^{1},l} vg cop (Ambrose) Jerome
της ζυμης του αρτου (of the leaven of the bread) — C E F G H K^{c} O W X Y Γ Δ Π Σ 13 22 28 124^{c} 180 205 387^{c} 597 700 828 1006 1010 1071 1079 1195 1230 1242 1243 1253 1292 1344 1365 1500* 1505 1546 1646 2145* 2148 2174 𝔐 Lect it^{c,f,q} syr^{p,h} cop^{sa^{ms},bo^{mss}} eth geo^{mss} slav Diatessaron^{pt} Gaudentius Chrysostom
της ζυμης των Φαρισαιων (of the leaven of the Pharisees) — 33 1295*
της ζυμης των Φαρισαιων και Σαδδουκαιων (of the leaven of the Pharisees and Sadduccees) — א^{*} 30 387* (579) 722 785 1093 (1240) 1279 1402 2297 2714 it^{ff^{1}} syr^{c} Diatessaron^{pt}

Matthew 16:13

τινα λεγουσιν οι ανθρωποι ειναι τον υιον του ανθρωπου (Who are the people claiming the Son of Man to be?) — B 𝑙^{1353} it^{c} vg^{mss} syr^{pal} cop eth Origen Jerome Cyril^{pt}
τινα λεγουσιν ειναι οι ανθρωποι τον υιον του ανθρωπου (Who are the people claiming the Son of Man to be??) — 1582*
τινα λεγουσιν με οι ανθρωποι ειναι τον υιον του ανθρωπου (What are the people claiming me to be? The Son of Man?) — C W syr arm geo slav Diatessaron^{(arm)}
τινα με λεγουσιν οι ανθρωποι ειναι τον υιον του ανθρωπου (What are the people claiming me to be? The Son of Man?) — E F G H K L X Δ Θ Π Σ ƒ^{13} 28 33 118 157 180 205 565 597 892 1006 1009 1010 1071 1079 1195 1216 1230 1241 1242 1243 1253 1292 1342 1344 1365 1424 1505 1546 1646 2148 2174 𝔐 Lect it^{aur,d,f,ff^{2},g^{1},l} vg^{(mss)} Irenaeus^{(lat)} (Tertullian) Origen Adamantius^{vid} (Hilary) (Ephraem) (Ambrose) Epiphanius Chrysostom Severian Marcus Eremita (Augustine) Cyril^{pt} Theodotus-Ancyra John-Damascus
τινα με λεγουσιν ειναι οι ανθρωποι τον υιον του ανθρωπου (Who are the people claiming me, the Son of Man, to be?) — ƒ^{1} 1 1582^{c} it^{ff^{1}}
τινα με οι ανθρωποι λεγουσιν ειναι τον υιον του ανθρωπου (What are the people claiming me to be? The Son of Man?) — D it^{a,b,e,q,r^{1}}
τινα οι ανθρωποι με λεγουσιν ειναι τον υιον του ανθρωπου (Who are the people claiming me, the Son of Man, to be?) — א^{2} 579 700 Cyril^{pt}
τινα οι ανθρωποι με ειναι λεγουσιν τον υιον του ανθρωπου (What are the people claiming me to be? The Son of Man?) — א*
τις λεγει ο οχλος περι του υιον του ανθρωπου εστιν ουτος (Regarding the Son of Man, who is the crowd saying this is?) — Codex Schøyen

Matthew 16:19

κλειδας (keys) — א* B* L W
κλεις (key) — א^{2} B^{c} C D ƒ^{1} ƒ^{13} 𝔐

Matthew 16:20

διεστειλατο (commanded) — א B^{c} C L W Θ ƒ^{1} ƒ^{13} 𝔐 lat syr^{p,h} cop Origen^{mss}
επετιμησεν (rebuked) — B* D it^{(d),e} syr^{c} arm arab^{ms} Origen^{mss}

Matthew 16:20

μαθηταις αυτου (his disciples) — L W Θ ƒ^{1} ƒ^{13} 𝔐 lat syr cop
μαθηταις (the disciples) — א B C D 700 cop^{sa^{mss}}

Matthew 16:20

ο Χριστος Ιησους (the Christ Jesus) — D it^{c}
Ιησους ο Χριστος (Jesus the Christ) — א^{2} C E F G H K W X Σ 13 22 157 205 372 579 828 892 1006 1071 1241 1243 1292 2737 𝔐 Lect it^{d,f,l,q,r^{1}} vg syr^{h} cop^{sa^{ms},bo,mae} eth geo^{mss} slav^{mss} Jerome Augustine
ο Χριστος (the Christ) — א* B L Δ Θ Π ƒ^{1} 28 124 174 180 565 598 700 788 1010 1342 1424 1505 1675 𝑙^{68} 𝑙^{673} 𝑙^{813} 𝑙^{1223} it^{a,aur,b,e,ff^{1},ff^{2},g^{1}} vg^{mss} syr^{c,p} cop^{sa^{mss}} arm geo^{mss} slav^{mss} Diatessaron Origen Hilary Ambrose Chrysostom

Matthew 16:21

ο Ιησους Χριστος (Jesus Christ) — 1279
Ιησους Χριστος (Jesus Christ) — א* B* cop^{sa^{mss},bo,mae-1}
ο Ιησους (Jesus) — א^{2} C K L W X Δ Θ Π ƒ^{1} ƒ^{13} 28 372 565 700 1009 1010 1071 1079 1195 1216 1230 1241 1242 1253 1344 1365 1546 1646 2148 2174 2737 𝔐 Lect latt syr cop^{sa^{ms},bo} arm eth geo^{mss} Origen Basil Augustine
Ιησους (Jesus) — B^{c} D
omit text — א^{1} 579 892 1604 cop^{mae-2} geo^{mss} arab^{ms} Irenaeus^{lat} Chrysostom

Matthew 16:21

γραμματεων του λαου (scribes of the people) — Θ Φ ƒ^{1} ƒ^{13} 1424 1675 arm geo^{mss} cop^{mae-1} Origen^{lat}
γραμματεων (scribes) — rell

Matthew 16:21

μετα τρεις ημερας (after three days) — D it cop^{bo}
τη τριτη ημερα (on the third day) — rell

Matthew 16:21

αναστηναι (to rise/stand up) — D 157 cop^{bo}
εγερθηναι (to be raised) — rell

Matthew 16:22

λεγει επιτιμων αυτω (admonishing, saying to him) — B 346
ηρξατο επιτιμαν αυτω λεγων (began admonishing, saying to him) — א C K L W Γ Δ 579 892 1241 𝔐 syr^{(p),h}
ηρξατο αυτω επιτιμαν λεγων (began admonishing to him, saying) — ƒ^{1} ƒ^{13} 700 1424
ηρξατο αυτω επιτιμαν αυτω λεγων (began admonishing to him, saying to him) — 565
ηρξατο αυτον επιτιμαν λεγων (began admonishing him, saying) — Θ
ηρξατο αυτω επιτιμαν και λεγειν (began admonishing to him and saying) — D (it)

Matthew 16:23

αλλα του ανθρωπου (but of man) — D it^{d,ff^{(1)},q}
text omitted — it^{e,ff^{2},g^{1},r^{1}}
αλλα τα των ανθρωπων (but the things of men) — rell

Matthew 16:24

Ιησους (Jesus) — B*
text omitted — 565 cop^{sa^{ms}}
ο Ιησους (Jesus) — rell

Matthew 16:26

ωφελειται (is profited) — C D K W Γ Δ 565 1241 1424 𝔐 lat syr^{h} Justin Clement
ωφεληθησεται (will be profited) — א B L Θ ƒ^{1} ƒ^{13} 33 579 700 892 it^{e,f,q} cop Origen Cyril

Matthew 16:27

την πραξιν αυτου (their doing) — א^{2} B C D E G H L W Δ Θ Σ ƒ^{13} 33 157 180 205 565 579 700 892 1006 1010 1071 1241 1243 1292 1342 𝔐 Lect it^{aur,e,l} vg^{mss} Origen^{pt} Apollinaris Didymus Chrysostom^{pt} Jerome^{pt}
τα εργα αυτου (their deeds) — א* F ƒ^{1} 28 597 1424 it^{a,b,c,d,f,ff^{1},ff^{2},g^{1},q} vg^{mss} syr cop eth geo slav Hippolytus^{vid} Origen^{lat} Chrysostom^{pt} Jerome^{pt}
την ταξιν αυτου (their arrangement) — 1505 𝑙^{184}
την αξιαν αυτου (their merit) — 𝑙^{387}

Matthew 16:28

δοξη του Πατρος (glory of the Father) — א^{c} 892 eth cop^{bo}
βασιλεια (kingdom) — rell

30 Textual variants in Matthew 17

Matthew 17:1

levavit (he took them up) — it^{d}
inposuit (he positioned them) — it^{e}
ducit (he leads them) — lat
αναγει αυτους (he leads them up) — D 1 1582 cop^{bo^{ms},mae-2} Origen
αναφερει αυτους (he brings them) — rell

Matthew 17:1

λιαν (very) — D it^{d} Eusebius
κατ’ ιδιαν (privately) — rell

Matthew 17:2

χιων (snow) — D lat syr^{c} cop^{bo^{mss}} eth^{mss} geo^{mss} slav^{ms} Hilary Epiphanius Chromatius Jerome Cyril^{pt}
το φως (the light) — א B C E F G H L O W Δ Θ Σ ƒ^{1} ƒ^{13} 28 33 157 180 205 565 579 597 700 892 1006 1010 1071 1241 1243 1292 1342 1424 1505 𝔐 Lect it^{q} syr^{p,h,pal} cop^{sa,bo^{mss},mae} arm eth geo^{mss} slav^{mss} Origen Eusebius Asterius Chrysostom Cyril^{pt} Hesychius Theodoret

Matthew 17:3

ωφθη (he was seen) — 𝔓^{44}^{vid} א B D Θ ƒ^{13} 33 579 it^{mss} vg^{mss} syr^{c} Tertullian
ωφθησαν (they were seen) — C K L W Γ Δ ƒ^{1} 565 700 892 1241 1424 𝔐 Lect it^{f,ff^{1},q} vg^{mss} syr^{p,h} Cyril

Matthew 17:4

ποιήσω (I will make) — it^{ff^{1}} Chromatius^{pt}
ποιησω ωδε (I will make here) — א B C* 700* it^{b,ff^{2}} vg^{mss} Chromatius^{pt} Jerome
ποιησομεν ωδε (we will make here) — ƒ^{1} 565 1292 𝑙^{866} eth
ποιησωμεν (we can make) — 579 vg^{mss} arm (Diatessaron) Gregory
ποιησωμεν ωδε (we can make here) — C^{c} D E F G H K L O W Γ Δ Θ Σ 0281 ƒ^{13} 28 33 157 180 205 565 597 700^{c} 892 1006 1010 1071 1241 1243 1342 1424 1505 𝔐 Lect lat cop geo slav Origen Chrysostom Chromatius^{pt} Augustine

Matthew 17:5

φωτος (of light) — ƒ^{13} 209 syr^{c}
φωτεινη (bright) — rell

Matthew 17:7

και αψαμενος αυτων ειπεν (and upon them being touched, he said) — א B Θ ƒ^{13} 579 700 892 𝑙^{2211}
ηψατο αυτων και ειπεν (he touched them and said) — C K L W Γ Δ ƒ^{1} 33 565 1241 1424 𝔐 Lect it^{q} syr^{(h)}
και ηψατο αυτων και ειπεν (and he touched them and said) — D

Matthew 17:8

τον Ιησουν μονον μεθ’ εαυτων (only Jesus was with them) — C^{c} 33
τον Ιησουν μονον (only Jesus) — B^{c} C* E F G K L M S U Y Γ Δ Π Ω ƒ^{1} ƒ^{13} 1 2 13 28 35 118 124 157 346 372 565 579 788 892 1005 1071 1424 1582 2358 2372 2737 𝔐 Lect
Ιησουν μονον (only Jesus) — W
μονον τον Ιησουν (Jesus alone) — D lat syr cop arm
Ιησουν αυτον μονον (only Jesus himself) — א
αυτον Ιησουν μονον (only Jesus himself) — B* Θ 700 it^{q}
αυτον μονον (only himself) — Codex Schøyen

Matthew 17:9

εγερθη (may be raised) — B D 1604 it syr^{c} Origen
αναστη (may stand up) — א C E F G H K L M S U (W) Y Z Γ Δ Θ Π Ω ƒ^{1} ƒ^{13} 1 2 13 28 33 35 118 124 157 346 565 579 700 788 892 1005 1071 1241 1424 1582 2358 2372 𝔐 Lect

Matthew 17:10

οι μαθηται αυτου (his disciples) — B C D E F G H K M S U Y Δ Π Ω ƒ^{13} 2 13 28 35 118 157 346 565 579 788 1005 1009 1010 1071 1079 1195 1216 1230 1241 1242 1253 1344 1365 1424 1546 1646 2148 2174 2358 2372 𝔐 Lect it^{f,ff^{2},q} syr^{c,p,h} cop^{bo^{mss},mae,fay} eth Diatessaron Chrysostom
οι μαθηται (the disciples) — א L W Z Θ ƒ^{1} 1 33 124 700 892 1582 it^{a,aur,b,c,d,e,ff^{1},g^{1},l} vg syr^{pal} cop^{sa,bo^{mss}} arm geo Origen Augustine

Matthew 17:11

Ιησους (Jesus) — omitted by א B D L W Z ƒ^{1} 1 33 579 892 1424 1582 lat syr^{c} cop

Matthew 17:11

ελευσεται (will come) — Justin
ερχεται (comes) — א B D W Θ ƒ^{1} 1 22 33 517 579 700 788 (1424) 1582 1675 2737 lat syr^{c} cop
ερχεται πρωτον (comes first) — C E F G H K (L) M S U Y Z Δ Π Ω ƒ^{13} 2 13 28 35 118 124 157 346 372 565 892 1005 1071 2358 2372 𝔐 Lect it^{f,q} syr^{p,h}

Matthew 17:13

του βαπτιστου (the baptist) — omitted by 1424 it^{ff^{1}} syr^{s} Chrysostom

Matthew 17:14

τοτε ηλθον προς αυτον οι μαθηται αυτου (then his disciples came toward him) — Codex Schøyen
και (and) — rell

Matthew 17:15

κυριε (sir) — omitted by א

Matthew 17:15

εχει (he has) — א B L O Z^{vid} Θ Σ 579 2766 Origen Chrysostom
πασχη (he suffers) — 1071
πασχει (he is suffering) — C D E F G H K M S U W X Y Γ Δ Π Ω ƒ^{1} ƒ^{13} 1 2 13 22 28 33 35 118 124 157 346 372 565 700 788 892 1005 1009 1010 1071 1079 1195 1216 1230 1241 1242 1253 1344 1365 1424 1546 1582 1646 2148 2174 2358 2372 2737 𝔐 Lect lat syr cop arm geo Chrysostom

Matthew 17:15

ενιοτε (sometimes) — D Θ ƒ^{1} 22 it^{mss} cop^{mae} arm Origen
text omitted — W
πολλακις (oftentimes) — rell

Matthew 17:17

Ιησους (Jesus) — omitted by א*

Matthew 17:17

πονηρα (evil) — Z 𝑙^{2211}
απιστος (unbelieving) — rell

Matthew 17:19

αυτου (his) — 1071 1424
τω Ιησου (to Jesus) — rell

Matthew 17:20

Ιησους ειπεν (Jesus said) — C E F G (H) K L M S U W X Y Γ Δ Π Ω 2 4 7 8 22 28 35 43 44 118 157 201 438 565 1005 1071 1241 1424 2358 2372 𝔐 Lect it^{f,q} vg^{mss} syr^{p,h}
Ιησους λεγει (Jesus declared) — f^{1} 1 13 346 1582 it^{b,c,e}
ειπεν (said) — it^{a}
λεγει (declared) — א B D Θ 0281 f^{13} 33 124 579 700 788 892 it^{ff^{2},g^{1}} vg^{mss} syr^{s,c} cop

Matthew 17:20

απιστιαν (lack of faith) — C D E F G H K L M O S U W Χ Y Γ Δ Π Σ Ω 2 4 7 8 28 35 43 44 118 157 180 201 205 372 438 565 597 1005 1006 1009 1010 1071 1079 1195 1216 1230 1241 1242 1243 1253 1292 1342 1344 1365 1424 1505 1546 1646 2148 2174 2358 2737 𝔐 Lect latt syr^{s,p,h} slav (Hilary) Chrysostom Jerome Augustine Speculum
ολιγοπιστιαν (little faith) — א Β Θ 0281 f^{1} f^{13} 1 13 22 33 124 346 579 700 788 892 1192 1582 2372 2680 𝑙^{2211} syr^{c,pal} cop arm eth geo Diatessaron Origen John-Damascus

Matthew 17:21

verse omitted — א* B Θ 0281 33 579 788 892* 1604 2680 𝑙^{253} it^{e,ff^{1}} syr^{s,c,pal} cop^{sa,bo,^{mss},mae-2} eth^{ms} geo^{mss} Eusebius

Matthew 17:22

παραγοντων (passing by) — cop^{sa^{mss},mae-2}
στρεφομενων (turning back) — 1582* Origen^{pt}
υποστρεφοντων (returning) — 579
συστρεφομενων (assembling) — א B 0281^{vid} f^{1} 1 118 892 1582^{mg} lat syr^{(pal)} Origen^{pt} Hilary Jerome Augustine
αναστρεφομενων (abiding) — C (D) E F G H K L M O S U W X Y Γ Δ Θ Π Σ f^{13} 2 4 7 8 13 22 28 33 35 43 44 124 157 180 201 205 346 438 565 597 700 788 1005 1006 1009 1010 1071 1079 1195 1216 1230 1241 1242 1243 1253 1292 1342 1344 1365 1424 1505 1546 1646 2148 2174 2358 2372 2737 𝔐 Lect it^{c,(e),ff^{1}} syr^{s,c,p,h} cop^{sa^{mss},bo,mae-1} arm eth slav Chrysostom^{lem}

Matthew 17:23

μετα τρεις ημερας (after three days) — D it^{a,b,c,e,q} syr^{s} cop^{bo}
τη τρι ημερα (on day three) — B* 346^{(c)}
τη τριτη ημερα (on the third day) — rell

Matthew 17:23

αναστησεται (he will arise) — B 047 f^{13} 13 118 124 346 788 892 1424
εγερθησεται (he will be raised) — rell

Matthew 17:23

και ελυπηθησαν σφοδρα (and they were exceedingly aggrieved) — omitted by K 2358

Matthew 17:25

οτε εισηλθεν ο Ιησους (when Jesus entered) — W*
οτε εισηλθον (they entered) — U 8 201
εισελθοντων (upon them entering) — Θ f^{13} 13 124 346 788 it^{a}
εισελθοντα (upon entering) — א^{*,2} 579
εισελθοντι (upon him entering) — D it^{b}
οτε ηλθον (when they had come) — C
ελθοντα (upon arriving) — א^{1} B f^{1} 1 892 1582
ελθοντων αυτων (upon them arriving) — 33
οτε εισηλθεν (when he entered) — E F G H K L M S W^{c} X Y Γ Δ Π Ω 2 4 7 22 28 35 43 44 118 157 438 565 700 892 1005 1071 1241 1342 1424 2358 2372 𝔐 Lect lat syr

Matthew 17:26

λεγει αυτω ο Πετρος (Peter says to him) — (C) E F G K (L) M S U W X^{c} Y Γ Δ Π Σ Ω f^{13} 2 4 7 8 13 22 (28) 35 43 44 118 124 157 180 201 205 346 438 565 579 597 788 1005 1006 1009 1010 1071 1079 1195 1216 (1230) 1241 1242 1243 1253 1292 1342 1344 1365 1424 1546 1646 2148 2174 2372 𝔐 Lect it^{f,(q)} syr^{c,p,h} cop^{(mae)} eth^{ms} geo^{mss} slav Diatessaron Origen^{pt} Basil
λεγει αυτω Πετρος (Peter says to him) — H 28 1505 𝑙^{1223}
λεγει αυτω (He says to him) — D it^{d} syr^{s} cop^{bo^{mss}}
ειποντος δε του Πετρου (Then Peter said) — 892^{mg}
ειποντος δε Πετρου (Then Peter said) — geo^{mss} Origen^{pt} (Juvencus) (Ambrose) John-Damascus
ειποντος δε (Then he said) — (א) B Θ 0281 f^{1} 1 700 892* 1582 lat syr^{pal} cop^{sa,bo^{mss}} arm eth^{mss} geo^{mss} Chrysostom (Jerome)
text omitted — X* 33 2358

Matthew 17:26

αρα γε ελευθεροι εισιν οι υιοι εφη Σιμων ναι λεγει ο Ιησους δος ουν και συ ως αλλοτριος αυτων (Then indeed the sons are free. Simon was saying, "Yes." Jesus says, "Therefore, you too must give as their foreigner.") — 713 Diatessaron Ephraem
αρα τε ελευθεροι εισιν οι υιοι (Then the sons are altogether free.) — 579
αρα γε ελευθεροι εισιν (Then indeed they are free.) — 2372*
αρα γε ελευθεροι εισιν υιοι (Then indeed sons are free.) — X f^{13} 13 118 346 788
αρα γε ελευθεροι εισιν οι υιοι (Then indeed the sons are free.) — rell

37 Textual variants in Matthew 18

Matthew 18:1

ημερα και ωρα (day and hour) — 1071
ημερα (day) — Θ f^{1} 1 33 517 700 713 954 1071 1424 1582 1675 it^{a,aur,b,c,e,ff^{1},ff^{2},g^{1},n,r^{1}} syr^{s,c,pal} arm geo arab^{ms} Origen^{pt}
ωρα (hour) — rell

Matthew 18:2

ο Ιησους (Jesus) — omitted by א B F L Z 078* 0281 f^{1} 1 33^{vid} 700 892* 1241 1582* cop^{bo}

Matthew 18:7

ουαι τω ανθρωπω εκεινω (woe to that man) — B E G H K M N S U (W) X Y Γ Δ Θ Π Ω 0281^{vid} f^{13} 2 4 7 8 13 28 33 35 43 44 118 124 157 201 346 372 438 565 700 788 1005 1009 1010 1071 1079 1195 1216 1230 1241 1242 1253 1344 1365 1424 1546 1646 2148 2358 2372 2737 𝔐 Lect it^{a,b,c,e,f,ff^{1},ff^{2},l,n,q} vg^{mss} cop^{sa^{mss}} arm eth geo Diatessaron Clement Cyprian Adamantius Hilary Lucifer Basil Augustine Cyril John-Damascus
ουαι τω ανθρωπω (woe to a man) — א D F L f^{1} 1 22 579 892 1582 𝑙^{184} it^{aur,d,g^{1}} vg^{mss} syr cop^{sa^{mss},bo,mae} (Origen) Didymus

Matthew 18:8

εξελε αυτον (remove it) — א^{*}
εκκοψον αυτον (cut it off) — א B D L Θ f^{1} f^{13} 1 13 124 157 346 579 788 892 1010 1071 1241* 1424 1582 lat syr^{s,c}
εκκοψον αυτην (cut it off) — U 28 it^{aur}
εκκοψον αυτα (cut them off) — E F G H K M N S W X Y Γ Δ Π Ω 2 4 7 8 22 33 35 43 44 118 201 438 565 700 1005 1241^{c} 2358 2372 𝔐 Lect syr^{h} cop^{bo}

Matthew 18:8

την γεενναν την αιωνιαν (the perpetual Gehenna) — it^{c,e}
την γεενναν του πυρος (the Gehenna of fire) — f^{1} 1 1582 it^{ff^{1}} syr^{c}
το πυρ το αιωνιον (the perpetual fire) — rell

Matthew 18:10

τουτων των πιστευοντων εις εμε (these who are believing in me) — D it^{mss} vg^{mss} syr^{c} cop^{sa^{mss}}
τουτων (these) — rell

Matthew 18:10

εν τω ουρανω (in heaven) — B (33) 892 Basil
text omitted — N* Γ Σ f^{1} f^{13} 1 13 22 1582 it^{aur,e,ff^{1}} syr^{s} cop^{sa^{mss}} Clement Origen Eusebius Didymus^{pt}
εν ουρανοις (in the heavens) — rell

Matthew 18:11

ηλθεν και ο υιος του ανθρωπου ζητησαι και σωσαι το απολωλος (And the Son of Man has come to seek and to save the lost.) — Lect^{pt}
ηλθεν γαρ ο υιος του ανθρωπου ζητησαι και σωσαι το απολωλος (For the Son of Man has come to seek and to save the lost.) — G L^{(mg)} M 157 346 579 713 892^{mg} 1009 1010 1195 1216 1243 1342 1505 𝔐^{pt} Lect^{pt} it^{c} syr^{h} cop^{bo^{mss}} eth slav
ηλθεν γαρ ο υιος του ανθρωπου σωσαι το απολωλος (For the Son of Man has come to save the lost.) — D E F H K N S W X Y Γ Δ Θ^{c} Π Σ Ω 078^{vid} 1^{c} 22 28 180 205 372 565 597 700 1006 1071 1079 1230 1241 1242 1253 1292 1344 1365 1424 1546 1646 2148 2174 2737 𝔐^{pt} Lect^{pt} lat syr^{c,p} arm geo Diatessaron Hilary Chrysostom Chromatius Augustine
Verse omitted — א B L* Θ* f^{1} f^{13} 1* 9 33 146 556 788 837 892* 899* 929* 1294 1502 2317 2680 it^{e,ff^{1}} syr^{s,pal} cop^{sa,bo^{mss},mae} geo^{mss} Origen^{vid} Juvencus Eusebius Apostolic Canons Eusebian Canons Hilary Jerome

Matthew 18:12

ενενηκοντα εννεα προβατα (ninety-nine sheep) — B E^{(*)} Θ f^{13} 13 346 788 1424* cop^{sa^{mss,mae}} arab^{ms}
ενενηκοντα εννεα (ninety-nine) — rell

Matthew 18:14

εμπροσθεν (in front of) — omitted by א 788 cop^{bo}

Matthew 18:14

πατρος υμων (your father) — א D^{c} E G K L M S U V W X Y Δ Π Ω f^{1} 1 2 7 8 22 28 35 43 44 118 201 205 372 438 597 771 1005 1006 1009 1071 1079 1195 1242 1292 1342 1344 1365 1505 1546 1582 2174 2358 2372 2737 𝔐^{pt} Lect^{pt} latt syr^{c,p,h^{mg}} slav Chrysostom Jerome Augustine Speculum
πατρος μου (my father) — B F H N O Γ Θ Σ 078 0281 f^{13} 13 33 124 157 180 346 579 700 788 892 1010 1216 1230 1241 1243 1253 1424 𝔐^{pt} Lect^{pt} syr^{s,h} cop arm eth geo Origen Pseudo-Macarius
πατρος ημων (our father) — D* 4 1646 2148 𝑙^{890} Chrysostom^{mss}
text omitted — syr^{pal} Diatessaron Apostolic Constitutions

Matthew 18:15

αμαρτησει εις σε (if he will sin against you) — (L) Θ 2 118 1071 1195 1344 1546 1646 2372
αμαρτηση εις σε (if he sins against you) — D E F G H K M N O S U W X Y Γ Δ Π Σ Ω 078 f^{13} 4 13 28 44 124 157 205 346 438 565 597 700 788 892 1006 1010 1071 1079 1216 1230 1241 1242* 1243 1253 1292 1365 2174 2358 2737 𝔐 Lect^{pt} latt syr cop^{bo^{mss},mae} arm eth geo slav^{mss} Cyprian Hilary Lucifer Basil^{ms} Pacian Chrysostom^{mss} Chromatius Jerome Augustine^{pt}
αμαρτη εις σε (if he sins against you) — W 7 8 33 35 43 180 201 1009 1242^{c} 1342 (1424) 1505 1582^{c} 2148 Lect^{pt} Basil^{pt} Didymus Chrysostom Theodoret
αμαρτησει (if he will sin) — 579
αμαρτηση (if he sins) — א B 0281 f^{1} 1 22 1582* cop^{sa,bo^{mss}} slav^{mss} Cyril Augustine^{pt}
αμαρτη (if he sins) — Origen^{lem} Basil^{pt}

Matthew 18:16

μαρτυρων (witnesses) — omitted by D it^{d}

Matthew 18:17

σοι λοιπον (to you henceforth) — f^{1} 1 22 1005 1365 1582 2372 cop^{mae-1} Basil^{pt}
text omitted — L
σοι (to you) — rell

Matthew 18:18a

εν τοις ουρανοις (in the heavens) — א D^{c} L 0281 28 33 579 892 it^{c,f} vg^{mss} cop
εν τω ουρανω (in the heaven) — E F G H K M N S U W X Y Γ Δ Π Ω 058^{vid} f^{1} 1 2 4 7 8 13 22 35 43 44 69 118 157 201 346 438 565 700 771 1005 1071 1241 1424 1582 2358 2372 𝔐 Lect
εν ουρανω (in heaven) — B Θ f^{13} 124 788 it^{a,b,e,ff^{2},g^{1},h,q}
text omitted — D*

Matthew 18:18b

εν τοις ουρανοις (in the heavens) — D L M 0281 33 157 579 it^{c,f} vg^{mss} cop
εν τω ουρανω (in the heaven) — E F G H K N S U W X Y Δ Π Ω 058 f^{1} 1 2 4 7 8 13 22 28 35 43 44 69 118 201 346 438 565 700^{c} 771 892 1005 1071 1241 1424 1582 2358 2372 𝔐 Lect
εν ουρανω (in heaven) — א B Θ f^{13} 124 788 it^{a,b,e,ff^{2},g^{1},h,q}
text omitted — 700*

Matthew 18:19

παλιν αμην λεγω (Truly I am again saying) — B E F G H K S Y Π Ω 058 078 4 7 8 13 22 28 33 43 44 157 180 201 205 438 597 700 771 828 1006 1010 1071 1241 1243 1292 1342 1505 𝔐 Lect it^{a,b,c,f,g^{1},h,n,(q),r^{1}} vg syr^{s,c,pal^{mss}} cop^{sa,bo^{ms},mae} geo^{mss} Origen^{lat} Basil
παλιν δε λεγω (But again I am saying) — M N O (W) Δ Σ syr^{h} eth Chrysostom
παλιν ακουετε λεγω (Listen, again I am saying) — it^{e}
λεγω δε (But I am saying) — Cyprian (Speculum)
παλιν λεγω (I am again saying) — א D L Γ f^{1} 1 579 892 1582 𝑙^{524} it^{aur,d,ff^{2},l} vg syr^{p,pal^{ms}} cop^{bo} arm geo^{mss} Origen^{lem} Jerome
αμην λεγω (Truly I am saying) — Θ 124* 565 788 1424 it^{ff^{1}}

Matthew 18:20

ουκ εισιν γαρ δυο η τρεις συνηγμενοι εις το εμον ονομα παρ οις ουκ ειμει εν μεσω αυτων (For there are not two or three who have assembled in my name among whom I am not in their midst.) — D* it^{d,(g^{1})} syr^{s} Clement
ου γαρ εισιν δυο η τρεις συνηγμενοι εις το εμον ονομα εκει ειμι εν μεσω αυτων (For where there are two or three who have assembled in my name, I am there in their midst.) — rell

Matthew 18:24

εκατον (a hundred) — it^{c}
πολλων (many) — א^{*} cop Origen
μυριων (numerous or ten thousand) — rell

Matthew 18:25

ο κυριος (the master) — א B D L 579 it^{a} vg^{mss}
ο κυριος αυτου (his master) — E F G H K M N S U W Y Γ (Δ) Θ Π Ω 0281 f^{13} 2 4 7 8 13 22 28 33 35 43 44 69 118 124 157 201 346 438 565 788 892 1005 1071 1241 1424 2358 2372 𝔐 Lect it vg^{mss} syr^{p,h} cop
text omitted — f^{1} 1 700 1582 it^{g^{1}} syr^{s,c}

Matthew 18:25

εχει (has) — B Θ f^{1} 1 124 1582 arm
ειχεν (had) — rell

Matthew 18:26

δουλος εκεινος (that servant) — א^{c} D L O Δ Θ Σ 0281 33 579 892 lat syr cop^{bo,mae-1}
συνδουλος (fellow-servant) — 13
δουλος (servant) — א^{*} B E F G H K M S U W Y Γ Π Ω 058^{vid} f^{1} f^{13} 1 2 4 7 8 22 28 35 43 44 69 118 124 157 201 346 438 565 700 788 1005 1071 1241 1424 1582 2358 2372 𝔐 Lect it^{q} cop^{sa,mae-2}

Matthew 18:26

κυριε μακροθυμησον (Master, have patience) — א E F G H K L M O S U W Y Δ Π Σ Ω 058 0233 0281 f^{1} f^{13} 1 2 4 7 8 13 22 28 33 35 43 44 69 118 124 157 180 201 205 346 372 438 565 579 597 788 892 1005 1006 1009 1010 1071 1079 1195 1216 1230 1241 1242 1243 1253 1292 1342 1344 1365 1424 1505 1546 1582 1646 2148 2174 2358 2372 2737 𝔐 Lect it^{aur,(b),f,ff^{2},g^{1},(h),q,(r^{1})} vg^{mss} syr^{p,h,pal} cop eth slav Origen^{lat} Asterius Chromatius John-Damascus
μακροθυμησον (Have patience) — B D Θ 700 𝑙^{47}^{*} 𝑙^{76} 𝑙^{184} it^{a,c,d,e,ff^{1},l} vg^{mss} syr^{s,c} arm geo Diatessaron Origen^{pt} Lucifer Chrysostom

Matthew 18:26

και παντα σοι αποδωσω (and I will repay you everything) — E F G H K M S U W Y Γ Δ Π Ω f^{1} 1 2 4 7 8 22 28 35 43 44 118 201 346 438 565 1005 1071 1241 1424 1582 2358 2372 𝔐 Lect it^{f,q}
και παντα αποδωσω σοι (and I will repay everything to you) — א B L 0281 f^{13} 13 33 69 124 157 579 788 892 it^{a,c,g^{1},h} vg syr^{p,h}
και παντα αποδωσω (and I will repay everything) — D 700 it^{b,e,(ff^{1}),ff^{2}} syr^{s}
text omitted — Θ

Matthew 18:27

ο κυριος αυτου (his master) — syr^{c}
text omitted — syr^{s}
ο κυριος του δουλου (the servant's master) — B Θ f^{1} 1 124 1582* cop^{sa^{mss}}
ο κυριος του δουλου εκεινου (the master of that servant) — rell

Matthew 18:27

και πασαν την οφειλην εκεινην (and all that is owed) — 1424
και πασαν την οφειλην (and everything owed) — f^{1} 1 517 954 1582 1675 it^{ff^{1}} cop Origen
και το δανειον (and the debt) — rell

Matthew 18:28

αποδως μοι (You should repay me) — 1424
αποδος μοι (Repay me) — C E F G H K M S U Γ Δ Π^{c} Ω f^{13} 2 4 7 8 13 22 28 35 43 44 69 118 157 201 346 438 556 788 892^{c} 1005 1010 1071 1241 1582^{c} 2358 2372 𝔐 Lect it^{e,f} syr cop^{bo^{ms}}
αποδως (You should repay) — 579
αποδος (Repay) — א B D L W Y Θ Π* 058 f^{1} 1 33 124 565 700 771 892* 1582* lat cop

Matthew 18:29

προσεκυνει αυτον και παρεκαλει (prostrating himself, and imploring) — 28
εις τους ποδας αυτου παρεκαλει (towards his feet, imploring) — C^{c} E F H K M S U V W Y Γ Δ Π Ω f^{13} 2 4 7 8 13 22 33 35 43 44 69* 118 157 201 346 438 565 372 771 788 1005 1071 1241 1582^{c} 2358 2372 2737 𝔐 Lect it^{f,q} syr^{p,h} cop^{mae}
παρεκαλει (imploring) — א B C* D G L Θ 058^{vid} f^{1} 1 69^{c} 71 124 556 579 700 892 1396 1424 1573 1579 1582* lat syr^{s,c,pal} cop^{sa,bo} eth geo

Matthew 18:29

παντα αποδωσω (I will repay all) — א^{1} C^{c} K L W Y Γ Θ Π f^{1} f^{13} 1 13 22 28 33 69 124 157 346 543 556 565 579 771 788 1005 1424 1582 2372 it^{c,f,q} vg cop
αποδωσω (I will repay) — rell

Matthew 18:30

εως ου (until when) — D E F G H K M S U W Y Γ Δ Θ Π Ω f^{1} f^{13} 1 2 4 7 8 13 22 28 33 35 43 44 69 118 124 157 201 346 372 438 556 565 579 700 771 788 1005 1071 1241 1424 1582 2358 2372 2737 𝔐 Lect syr
εως (until) — א B C L 892 it

Matthew 18:30

παν το οφειλομενον (all that he owed) — C 124 892^{mg} 1424 it^{g^{1}}
το οφειλομενον (what he owed) — rell

Matthew 18:31

ουν (Therefore) — א^{*,2} B D 33 it^{e}
δε (But) — א^{1} C E F G H K L M S U W Y Γ Δ Θ Π Ω f^{1} f^{13} 1 2 4 7 8 13 22 28 35 43 44 69 118 124 157 201 346 438 556 565 579 700 771 788 892 1005 1071 1241 1424 1582 2358 2372 𝔐 Lect it cop^{sa,bo}

Matthew 18:32

αυτω (to him) — omitted by D Θ 22 700* 1424 2372 cop^{bo^{ms}}

Matthew 18:33

ουκ εδει ουν ελεησαι (Therefore, are you not obliged to show mercy) — 𝔓^{25}
ουκ εδει ουν και σε ελεησαι (Therefore, should you not also show mercy) — D Θ (lat) cop^{sa^{mss}}
ουκ εδει και σε ελεησαι (Should you not also show mercy) — rell

Matthew 18:34

πας (all) — omitted by D it^{d} syr^{s,c}

Matthew 18:34

αυτω (to him) — omitted by א^{1} B D Θ f^{13} 124 700 788 1424 2148 𝑙^{805} latt syr^{s,c} cop^{sa,bo} arm Diatessaron

Matthew 18:35

των καρδιων υμων τα παραπτωματα αυτων (your^{pl} hearts their trespasses) — C E F G H K M S U W Y Γ Δ Π Ω f^{13} 2 4 7 8 13 22^{mg} 28 33 35 43 44 69 118 124 157 201 346 438 556 565 579 771 788 892^{mg} 1005 1071 1241 1424 1582^{c} 2358 2372 𝔐 Lect it^{f,h} syr^{(p),h,pal}
των καρδιων υμων (your^{pl} hearts) — א B D L Θ f^{1} 1 22* 372 700 892* 1582* 2737 lat syr^{s,c} cop geo eth Origen Speculum

37 Textual variants in Matthew 19

Matthew 19:1

ελαλησεν (spoke) — D it^{a,b,c,d,e,ff^{2},g^{1}} cop^{bo^{mss}}
ετελεσεν (finished) — rell

Matthew 19:2

εκει (there) — omitted by 𝔓^{25}^{vid} it^{h} syr^{s}

Matthew 19:3

οι Φαρισαιοι (some Pharisees) — א D E F G H K S U Γ Ω* 2 7 8 13 22 28 35 43 44 69 157 201 346 438 556 1005 1009 1010 1071 1195^{c} 1216 1230 1241 1242 1253 1344 1365 1424 1646 2148 2174 2358 2372 𝔐 Lect cop^{sa^{mss}} arm Diatessaron Origen Gregory-Nazianzus
Φαρισαιοι (Pharisees) — 𝔓^{25}^{vid} B C L M W Y Δ Θ Π f^{1} f^{13} 1 4 33^{vid} 118 124 565 579 700 771 788 892 1010 1079 1195* 1546 1582 cop^{sa^{mss},bo,mae} John-Damascus

Matthew 19:3

ει εξεστιν τινι ανδρι (whether some husband is permitted) — arm
ει εξεστιν ανδρι (whether a husband is permitted) — 4 273 998 1223 1424^{c}
ει εξεστιν τινι (whether someone is permitted) — 700 geo^{mss}
ει εξεστιν ανθρωπω τινι (whether some man is permitted) — 565
ει εξεστιν ανθρωπω (whether a man is permitted) — א^{c} C D E F G H K M S U W Y Δ Θ Π Ω 087 f^{1} f^{13} 1 2 7 8 13 22 28 33 35 43 44 69 118 124 157 201 346 372 438 771 788 892 1005 1009 1010 1071 1079 1195 1216 1230 1241 1242 1253 1344 1365 1546 1582 1646 2148 2174 2358 2372 2737 𝔐 Lect latt syr cop^{sa,bo,mae-1} eth^{mss} geo^{mss} Diatessaron Origen Hilary Gregory-Nazianzus John-Damascus
εξεστιν ανθρωπω (a man is permitted) — 556
ει εξεστιν (whether it is permitted) — א* B L Γ 517 579 1424* Codex Schøyen eth^{mss} Clement Augustine

Matthew 19:4

ο ποιησας απ’ αρχης ανθρωπον (the maker from the beginning humankind) — 28 vg^{mss}
ο ποιησας απ’ αρχης (the maker from the beginning) — א C D E F G H K (L) M O S U W Y Z Γ Δ Π Σ Ω 0233 f^{13} 2 4 7 8 13 28 35 43 44 (69) 118 157 180 201 205 346 372 438 556 565 (579) 597 700 771 788 892 (1005) 1006 1009 1010 1071 1079 1195 1216 1230 1241 1242 1243 1253 1292 1342 1344 1365 1424 1505 1546 1646 2148 2174 2358 2737 𝔐 Lect lat syr^{c,p,h} slav Diatessaron Origen^{lat} Ambrosiaster Hilary Apostolic-Constitutions Gregory-Nazianzus Chrysostom Jerome Augustine Cyril Speculum John-Damascus
ο ποιησας (the maker) — it^{ff^{1},(ff^{2})} syr^{s}
text omitted — eth^{mss}
ο κτισας απ’ αρχης (the creator from the beginning) — B Θ f^{1} 1 22 33^{vid} 124 700 1582 2372 syr^{pal} it^{e} cop^{sa,bo,mae} arm eth^{mss} geo Origen (Methodius) Origen Serapion Athanasius Titus-Bostra Ps-Clementines

Matthew 19:7

απολυσαι την γυναικα (dismiss the wife) — it^{b,c,ff^{2}} vg^{mss} syr^{s,c} Irenaeus^{lat} Ambrose Speculum
απολυσαι αυτην (dismiss her) — B C E F G H K M N O S U W Y Γ Δ Π Σ Ω 078^{vid} 087^{vid} (0233) f^{13} 2 4 7 8 13 28 33 35 43 44 69 118 124 157 180 201 205 346 438 556 565 597 788 892 1005 1006 1009 1010 1071 1079 1195 1216 1230 1241 1242 1243 1253 1292 1342 1344 1365 1424 1505 1546 1646 2148 2174 2358 𝔐 Lect it^{f,q} syr^{p,h} cop^{(sa),bo^{ms},mae} eth^{mss} slav Chrysostom John-Damascus
απολυσαι (dismiss) — א D L Z Θ f^{1} 1 22 372 579 700 1582 2372 2737 it^{a,aur,d,e,ff^{1},g^{1},h,l} vg^{mss} syr^{pal} arm eth^{ms} geo Diatessaron Origen Jerome Augustine Ps-Chrysostom

Matthew 19:8

λεγει αυτοις ο ιησους (Jesus said to them) — א M it^{a,b,c} cop^{mae}
και λεγει αυτοις (And he said to them) — D*
λεγει αυτοις (He said to them) — rell

Matthew 19:9

παρεκτος λογου πορνειας και γαμηση αλλην ποιει αυτην μοιχευθηναι (except on account of sexual immorality, and marries another, causes her to commit adultery) — syr^{pal}
παρεκτος λογου πορνειας ποιει αυτην μοιχευθηναι (except on account of sexual immorality, causes her to commit adultery) — 𝔓^{25}^{vid} B 0233 1 4 1582 𝑙^{547} it^{ff^{1}} cop^{bo} eth^{mss} slav Origen Cyril
παρεκτος λογου πορνειας και γαμηση αλλην μοιχαται (except on account of sexual immorality, and marries another) — D f^{13} 33 69* (597) 𝑙^{184} 𝑙^{1016} lat syr^{(c)} cop^{sa,bo^{ms},mae} Origen^{lat} Chrysostom Speculum
ει μη επι πορνεια και γαμηση αλλην μοιχαται (except on the basis of sexual immorality, and marries another, causes her to commit adultery) — 69^{c}
μη επι πορνεια και γαμηση αλλην ποιει αυτην μοιχευθηναι (unless on the basis of sexual immorality, and marries another, causes her to commit adultery) — C* 1216
μη επι πορνεια ποιει αυτην μοιχευθηναι (unless on the basis of sexual immorality, causes her to commit adultery) — N
μη επι πορνεια και γαμηση αλλην μοιχαται (unless on the basis of sexual immorality, and marries another, commits adultery) — א C^{c} E F G H K L S Z Γ Δ Θ Π Σ Ω 078 2* 7 8 22 28 43 44 157 180 201 205 438 556 565 579 700 892 1006 1009 1010 1071 1079 1195 1230 1241 1242 1243 1253 1292 1342 1344 1365 1424 1505 1546 1646 2148 2174 𝔐 Lect it^{l} vg syr^{s,p,h} arm eth^{mss} geo Basil Jerome
μη επι πορνεια γαμηση αλλην μοιχαται (unless on the basis of sexual immorality, marries another, commits adultery) — W
και γαμηση αλλην (and marries another) — 1574

Matthew 19:9

ωσαυτως και ο γαμων απολελυμενην μοιχαται (And likewise anyone marrying a divorced woman commits adultery) — 𝔓^{25} cop^{mae-1}
και ο απολελυμενην απο ανδρος γαμων μοιχαται (And anyone marrying a divorced woman sent away by a man commits adultery) — 579
και ο απολελυμενην γαμων (or γαμησας) μοιχαται (And anyone marrying a divorced woman commits adultery) — B C* E F G H K M N O U W Y Z Γ Δ Θ Π Σ Ω 078 0233 f^{1} f^{13} 1 2^{c} 4 7^{mg} 8 13 22 28 33 35 43 44 118 124 157 180 201 205 209^{mg} 346 372 438 556 565 597 700 771 788 892 1005 1006 1009 1010 1071 1079 1195 1216 1230 1242 1243 1253 1292 1342 1344 1365 1424 1505 1582 1646 2148 2174 2358 2372 2737 𝔐 Lect it^{aur,c,f,q} vg^{mss} syr^{p,h,pal} cop^{bo^{mss}} arm eth geo slav Origen^{lat} Basil Cyril Jerome Speculum
text omitted — א C^{c} D L S 2* 7* 69 209* 828 1241 1546 𝑙^{253} 𝑙^{305} 𝑙^{845} 𝑙^{1074} it^{a,b,d,e,ff^{1},ff^{2},g^{1},h,l,r^{1}} vg^{ms} syr^{s,c} cop^{sa,bo^{ms},mae-2} Origen Chrysostom

Matthew 19:10

λεγουσιν οι μαθηται (The disciples said) — א*
λεγουσιν οι μαθηται αυτου (His disciples said) — 𝔓^{25}
λεγουσιν αυτω οι μαθηται (The disciples said to him) — 𝔓^{71}^{vid} א^{c} B Θ it^{e,ff^{1},g^{1}} cop^{sa^{ms},mae} Juvencus Jerome Speculum John-Damascus
λεγουσιν αυτω οι μαθηται αυτου (His disciples said to him) — C D E F G H K L M N S U W Y Z Δ Π Σ Ω 078 0233 f^{1} f^{13} 1 2 13 28 33 35 69 118 124 157 180 205 346 372 565 579 597 700 788 892 1005 1006 1009 1010 1071 1079 1195 1216 1230 1241 1242 1243 1253 1292 1342 1344 1365 1424 1505 1546 1582 1646 2148 2174 2358 2372 𝔐 Lect lat syr cop^{sa^{mss},bo} arm eth geo slav Diatessaron Augustine

Matthew 19:10

ει ουτως εστιν η αιτια (If this is the circumstance) — 892*
ει ουτως αιτιος γινεται ανθρωπος (If this man becomes liable) — 𝔓^{25}
ει ουτως εστιν η αιτια του ανδρος (If this is the circumstance of the husband) — D it^{a,b,c,ff^{2},g^{1},h,q}
ουτως εστιν η αιτια του ανθρωπου (This is the circumstance of the man) — א*
ει ουτως εστιν η αιτια του ανθρωπου (If this is the circumstance of the man) — rell

Matthew 19:11

ο δε Ιησους ειπεν (But Jesus said) — K M* Y Π 771 it^{a,b,c} syr^{c}
ο δε ειπεν (But he said) — rell

Matthew 19:11

των λογων τουτων (of these words) — Θ
τον λογον τουτον (this statement) — א C D E F G H K L M N S U W Y Z Γ Δ Π Σ Ω 078 0233 f^{13} 2 4 7 8 13 22 28 33 35 43 44 69 118 124 157 180 201 205 346 372 438 556 565 579 597 700 771 788 892^{mg} 1005 1006 1009 1010 1071 1079 1195 1216 1230 1241 1242 1243 1253 1292 1342 1344 1365 1424 1505 1546 1582^{c} 1646 2148 2174 2358 2372 2737 𝔐 Lect lat syr^{s,c,p,h} cop^{sa,bo^{mss},mae} arm eth^{mss} geo slav Basilidians^{per Clement} Clement Origen^{lat} Cyprian^{pt} Ps-Cyprian Basil Ambrose Jerome^{pt} Augustine Speculum Theodoret Ammonius-Alexandria John-Damascus
τον λογον (the statement) — B f^{1} 22 892* 1582* 𝑙^{184} it^{e} syr^{pal} cop^{bo^{ms}} eth^{mss} Origen Cyprian^{pt} Apollinaris Jerome^{pt} Theodore John-Damascus^{vid}
text omitted — Chrysostom

Matthew 19:13

προσηνεχθη (he was being brought) — E F G H K M S U W Y Γ Δ Θ Ω 078^{vid} f^{1} f^{13} 1 2 7 8 13 22 28 35 43 44 69 118 124 157 201 346 438 556 565 700 771 788 1005 1071 1582 2358 2372 𝔐 Lect
προσηνεχθησαν (they were being brought) — rell

Matthew 19:16

διδασκαλε αγαθε (Good teacher) — C E F G H K M S U W Y Γ Δ Θ Σ Ω f^{13} 2 4 7 8 13 28 33 35 43 44 69 118 124 157 180 201 205 346 372 438 556 565 579 597 700 771 788 892^{mg} 1005^{mg} 1006 1009 1071 1079 1195 1216 1230 1241 1242 1243 1253 1292 1342 1344 1424 1505 1546 1582^{mg} 1646 2148 2174 2358 2737 𝔐 Lect it^{aur,b,c,f,ff^{2},g^{1},h,l,q,r^{1}} vg syr cop^{sa,bo^{mss},mae-1} arm eth^{ms} geo^{mss} slav Diatessaron Marcus^{per Irenaeus} Justin Origen^{pt} Juvencus Basil Cyril-Jerusalem Chrysostom^{lem} Jerome
διδασκαλε (Teacher) — א B D L 1 22 892* 1005* 1010 1365 1582* 2372 𝑙^{5} it^{a,d,e,ff^{1}} cop^{bo^{mss},mae-2} eth^{mss} geo^{mss} Origen^{pt} Hilary

Matthew 19:16

ποιησας ζωην αιωνιον κληρονομησω (doing [that] I may inherit eonian life) — א L 28 33 157 892 1005 𝑙^{2211} it^{a,b,c,e,f,ff^{2},g^{1},h,q} syr^{s,(c),h^{mg}} cop^{bo}
ποιησω ζωην αιωνιον κληρονομησω (I can do [that] I may inherit eonian life) — 579
ποιησω ινα εχω ζωην αιωνιον (I can do that I may have eonian life) — C E F G H K M S U Y (W) Γ Δ Ω f^{1} f^{13} 1 2 4 7 8 13 22 35 43 44 69 118 124 346 201 438 556 565 700 788 1071 1241 1424 1582 2358 2372 𝔐 Lect
ποιησω ινα σχω ζωην αιωνιον (I can do that I may have eonian life) — B C D Θ 700 syr^{h}

Matthew 19:17

ο δε Ιησους ειπεν (But Jesus said) — E M 33 it^{a,b,c,ff^{2},(h)} syr^{c}
ο δε ειπεν (But he said) — rell

Matthew 19:17

τι με ερωτας περι του αγαθου (Why are you asking me about the good?) — א B (D) L Θ f^{1} 1 22 700 892* 1192* 1424^{(mg)} 1582* 2372 lat syr^{s,c,h^{mg},pal} cop^{bo^{mss},mae} arm geo eth^{mss} Marcion Clement Origen^{pt} Novatian Juvencus Dionysius Eusebius Augustine Antiochus Jerome
τι με λεγεις αγαθον (Why are you calling me good?) — C E F G H K M S U W Y (Δ) Σ Ω f^{13} 2 4 7 8 13 28 33 35 43 44 69 118 124 157 180 201 205 346 372 438 556 565 (579) 788 1005 1006 1009 1010 1071 1079 1195 1216 1230 1241 1242 1243 1253 1292 1342 1344 1365 1424* 1505 1546 1582^{mg} 1646 2148 2174 2358 2737 𝔐 Lect it^{f,q} syr^{p,h} cop^{sa,bo^{ms}} eth^{ms} slav Diatessaron Marcus^{per Irenaeus} Naassenes^{per Hippolytus} Justin Irenaeus Origen^{pt} Hilary Basil Epiphanius Chrysostom
text omitted — Γ

Matthew 19:17

ουδεις αγαθος ει μη ο πατηρ ο εν τοις ουρανοις (None [is] good except the Father who [is] in the heavens) — Clement^{pt}
ουδεις αγαθος ει μη εις ο θεος (None [is] good except the one God) — C E F G H K M S U W Y Γ Δ Σ Ω f^{13} 2^{c} 4 7 8 13 28 33 35 43 44 69 118 124 157 180 201 205 372 438 556 565 (579) 788 1005 1006 1009 1010 1071 1079 1195 1216 1230 1241 1242 1243 1253 1342 1344 1365 1424* 1505 1546 1582^{c} 1646 2148 2174 2358 2737 𝔐 Lect it^{f,g^{1},h,q} syr^{p,h} cop^{sa,bo^{ms}} eth^{ms} slav Irenaeus Origen Dionysius Eusebius Hilary Basil Augustine Antiochus Chrysostom
ουδεις αγαθος ει μη ο θεος (None [is] good except God) — 2* 346 1071
ουδεις εστιν ο αγαθος ει μη εις ο θεος (There is none good except the one God) — 892^{c}
ουδεις εστιν ο αγαθος (There is none good) — 892*
ο γαρ αγαθος εις εστιν ο πατηρ ο εν τοις ουρανοις (For the good is one: the Father who [is] in the heavens) — Ps-Clement
εις εστιν ο αγαθος ο πατηρ μου ο εν τοις ουρανοις (The one good is my Father who [is] in the heavens) — Justin (Juvencus)
εις εστιν ο αγαθος ο πατηρ ο εν τοις ουρανοις (The one good is the Father who [is] in the heavens) — Diatessaron Naassenes^{per Hippolytus}
εις εστιν ο αγαθος ο πατηρ εν τοις ουρανοις (The one good is the Father in the heavens) — Marcus^{per Irenaeus}
εις εστιν ο αγαθος ο πατηρ (The one good is the Father) — Marcion Clement^{pt} it^{e}
εις εστιν ο αγαθος ο θεος (The one good is God) — it^{aur,b,c,(ff^{1}),ff^{2},l,r^{1}} vg syr^{c,h^{mg},pal^{ms}} cop^{bo^{mss},mae} geo^{mss} Novatian Jerome
εις εστιν ο αγαθος (There is one good) — א B^{c} L Θ 1424^{mg} 1582* arm eth^{mss} geo^{mss} Origen
εις εστιν αγαθος (There is one good) — D f^{1} 1 22 700 1192* 2372 it^{a,d}
εστιν ο αγαθος (One is good) — B* syr^{s,pal^{mss}}

Matthew 19:18

ο δε λεγει αυτω ποιας (But he said to him, "Which ones?") — f^{1} 1 1582 it^{f}
ο δε φησι ποιας (But he says, "Which ones?") — 892
ποιας φησιν (He says, "Which ones?") — א L 124 579
λεγει αυτω ποιας (He said to him, "Which ones?") — rell

Matthew 19:18

Ιησους (Jesus) — omitted by 𝔓^{71} F f^{13} 13 124 346 788 1424 it^{e}

Matthew 19:18

ου μοιχευσεις ου κλεψεις (you will not commit adultery, you will not steal) — omitted by א*

Matthew 19:20

εφυλαξαμην εκ νεοτητος μου (I have kept from my youth) — C E F G H K M O S U W (X) Y Γ Δ Σ f^{13} 2 4 7 8 13 28 33 35 43 44 69 124 157 180 201 205 346 438 556 565 597 700^{c} 771 788 892 1005 1006 1010 1071 1241 1243 1292 1342 1424 1505 2358^{vid} 2372 2737 𝔐 Lect it^{a,b,c,e,f,ff^{2},h,n,q} vg^{mss} syr cop arm eth geo slav Origen (Hilary) Marcellus Ambrose Chrysostom Augustine (Cyril)
εφυλαξαμην εκ νεοτητος (I have kept from youth) — it^{d} 372
εφυλαξα εκ νεοτητος μου (I kept from my youth) — א^{c} 118
εφυλαξα εκ νεοτητος (I kept from youth) — D
εφυλαξα (I kept) — א* B L Θ f^{1} 1 22 579 700* 1582 2680 it^{aur,ff^{1},g^{1},l} vg^{mss} Cyprian Jerome

Matthew 19:20

τι ετι υστερω (What am I still lacking?) — omitted by syr^{s}

Matthew 19:21

λεγει (saying) — B Θ f^{13}
εφη (declaring) — rell

Matthew 19:21

ουρανω (heaven) — א E F G H K L M S U W Y Z Δ Θ Ω 0281 f^{1} f^{13} 1 2 4 7 8 13 22 28 33 35 43 44 118 124 157 201 346 438 556 565 579 700 771 788 892 1005 1071 1241 1424 1582 2358 2372 𝔐 Lect lat syr cop^{bo^{mss}}
ουρανοις (heavens) — B C D Γ it^{e,g^{1}} cop^{sa,bo^{ms},mae}

Matthew 19:22

τον λογον τουτον (this statement) — B 372 1230 1253 2737 𝑙^{5} 𝑙^{51} it^{a,b,c,ff^{1},n} vg^{mss} syr^{s,c,p} cop^{bo^{mss},mae} eth geo^{mss} Diatessaron
τον λογον (the statement) — C D E F G H K M S U W X Y Γ Δ Θ Ω f^{1} f^{13} 1 2 4 7 8 13 22 28 33 35 43 44 69 118 124 157 201 346 438 556 565 700 771 788 892 1005 1009 1010 1071 1079 1195 1216 1241 1242 1344 1365 1424 1546 1582 1646 2148 2174 2358 2372 𝔐 Lect it^{aur,d,ff^{2},g^{1},l,q} vg^{mss} syr^{h,pal} cop^{sa,bo^{mss}} arm (Origen)
text omitted — א L Z 0281 579 𝑙^{950} it^{e,f,h} geo^{mss} Chrysostom

Matthew 19:22

χρηματα (riches) — B Clement
κτηματα (possessions) — rell

Matthew 19:24

καμιλον (cable) — 174 579 1424 𝑙^{211} 𝑙^{524} 𝑙^{673} 𝑙^{858} 𝑙^{859} 𝑙^{866} 𝑙^{1086} arm Cyril
καμηλον (camel) — rell

Matthew 19:24

τρυπηματος (borehole) — א^{c} D E F G H L S W X Y Z Γ Δ Ω f^{1} f^{13} 1 2 7 8 13 22 28 33 35 43 44 69 118 201 346 438 556 579 771 788 892 1005 1010 1071 1241 1424 1582 2358 2372 2737 𝔐^{pt} Lect lat
τρυμαλιας (cleft) — C K M U Θ 0281 4 124 157 565 700 𝔐^{pt} 𝑙^{1086} 𝑙^{2211}
τρηματος (hole) — א^{*} B Origen

Matthew 19:24

διελθειν η πλουσιον εις την βασιλειαν του θεου (to pass through (it), than a rich man into the kingdom of God) — 565
διελθειν η πλουσιον εις την βασιλειαν των ουρανων (to pass through (it), than a rich man into the kingdom of the heavens) — it^{ff^{1}} syr^{c}
διελθειν η πλουσιον εις την βασιλειαν του θεου εισελθειν (to pass through (it), than one rich man to enter into the kingdom of God) — G S X Y Γ Ω 7 22 35 43 44 201 372 438 771 1005 1071 2372 2737 𝔐^{pt} Lect^{pt}
διελθειν η πλουσιον εισελθειν εις την βασιλειαν του θεου (to pass through (it), than one rich man to enter into the kingdom of God) — B D Θ 124 700 vg^{mss} syr^{p} cop^{sa^{mss},mae}
διελθειν η πλουσιον εισελθειν εις την βασιλειαν των ουρανων (to pass through (it), than one rich man to enter into the kingdom of the heavens) — it^{a,b,c,e,f,ff^{2},g^{1},h,q} vg^{mss}
εισελθειν η πλουσιον εις την βασιλειαν του θεου εισελθειν (to enter into (it), than one rich man to enter into the kingdom of God) — E H (W) Δ f^{13} 2 4 8 13 28 69 346 556 788 1241 1424 2358 𝔐^{pt} Lect^{pt} syr^{h}
εισελθειν η πλουσιον εισελθειν εις την βασιλειαν του θεου (to enter into (it), than one rich man to enter into the kingdom of God) — 579 syr^{p} cop^{sa^{mss},bo^{mss}}
εισελθειν η πλουσιον εις την βασιλειαν των ουρανων (to enter into (it), than a rich man into the kingdom of the heavens) — Z f^{1} 1 33 118 1582 syr^{s} cop^{bo^{ms}}
εισελθειν η πλουσιον εις την βασιλειαν του θεου (to enter into (it), than a rich man into the kingdom of God) — א L 0281 892

Matthew 19:25

οι μαθηται αυτου (his disciples) — C^{c} E F G H M S U W X Y Σ Ω f^{1} 1 2 4 7 8 22 28 35 43 44 118 157 201 346 438 556 771 1005 1009 1010 1071 1216 1230 1241 1242 1253 1344 1365 1424 1582 2174 2358 2372 𝔐 Lect it^{ff^{1}} syr^{c} cop^{mae} eth geo^{mss} John-Damascus
οι μαθηται (the disciples) — א B C* D K (L) Z Δ Θ f^{13} 13 33 69 124 565 579 700 788 892 1079 1195 1546 1646 2148 𝑙^{2211} lat syr^{s,p,h,pal} cop^{sa,bo} arm geo^{mss} Hilary

Matthew 19:25

εξεπλησσοντο και εφοβηθησαν (they were astonished and frightened) — D it^{mss} vg^{mss} syr^{c}
εξεπλησσοντο (they were astonished) — rell

Matthew 19:26

παρα ανθρωποις (with men) — omitted by א*

Matthew 19:26

παντα δυνατα εστιν (everything is possible) — C^{c} D E F G H M Ω 2 7 8 157 556 1424 2358 𝔐^{pt} Lect^{pt}
παντα δυνατα (all things are possible) — rell

Matthew 19:29

πατερα η μητερα η γυναικα (father or mother or wife) — א C E F G H K L M S U W X Y Γ Δ Θ Σ Ω f^{13} 2 4 7 8 13 22 28 33 35 43 44 69 118 124 157 180 201 205 346 372 438 556 565 579 597 700 771 788 892 1005 1006 1009 1010 1071 1079 1195 1216 1230 1241 1242 1243 1253 1292 1342 1344 1365 1424 1505 1546 (1646) 2174 2358 2372 2737 𝔐 Lect lat syr^{p,h} cop arm eth geo slav Basil Gregory-Nyssa Ambrose Jerome Cyril John-Damascus
πατερα η μητερα (father or mother) — B 2148 it^{a,n} syr^{pal} Clement^{vid} (Victorinus-Pettau) Chrysostom
μητερα (mother) — D it^{b,d,ff^{1},ff^{2}} syr^{s,(c)} Hilary Paulinus-Nola Speculum
γονεις (parents) — f^{1} 1 1582 it^{(e)} Irenaeus^{lat} Origen^{vid}

Matthew 19:29

εκατονταπλασιονα (hundredfold) – א C D E F G H K M S U W X Y Γ Δ Θ Σ f^{1} f^{13} 1 2 4 7 8 13 22 28 33 35 43 44 69 118 124 157 180 201 205 346 372 438 556 565 597 700 771 788 892 1005 1006 1009 1071 1079 1195 1216 1230 1241 1242 1243 1253 1292 1342 1344 1365 1424 1505 1546 1582 1646 2148 2174 2358 2372 2737 𝔐 Lect latt syr^{s,c,p,h} cop^{bo,mae-2} arm eth^{mss} geo slav Irenaeus^{lat} Victorinus-Pettau Asterius Hilary Basil Gregory-Nyssa Ambrose Chrysostom Jerome Paulinus-Nola Speculum
επταπλασιονα (sevenfold) – Ephraem
πολλαπλασίονα (manifold) – B L 579 1010 syr^{pal} cop^{sa,mae-1} eth^{ms} Diatessaron Origen Cyril

51 Textual variants in Matthew 20

Matthew 20:3

ευρεν (found) — D 1424 it^{mss}
ειδεν (saw) — rell

Matthew 20:4

αμπελωνα μου (my vineyard) — א C V Y Θ Π f^{13} 13 33 69 124 346 372 565 579 700 713 788 2737 it^{a,aur,c,e,f,ff^{1},ff^{2},g^{1},h,n,r^{1}} vg^{mss} syr^{h} cop^{sa,mae}
αμπελωνα (vineyard) — B D E F G H K L M S U W X Γ Δ Ω 085^{vid} f^{1} 1 2 4 7 8 22 28 35 43 44 118 157 201 438 556 892 1005 1071 1241 1424 1582 2358 2372 𝔐 Lect it^{b,d,l,q} vg^{mss} syr^{s,c,p,h^{mg}} cop^{bo}

Matthew 20:5

εξελθων ευρεν αλλους εστωτας περι εκτην και ενατην ωραν εποιησεν ωσαυτως (going out, he found others standing around at about the sixth and the ninth hour; he did likewise) — Δ
εξελθων περι εκτην και ενατην εποιησεν ωσαυτως (going out at about the sixth and the ninth, he did likewise) — (22) 579
text omitted — 28*
εξελθων περι εκτην και ενατην ωραν εποιησεν ωσαυτως (going out at about the sixth and the ninth hour, he did likewise) — rell

Matthew 20:6

ενδεκατην ωραν (the eleventh hour) — C E F G H K M S U W X Y Γ Δ Π Ω f^{1} f^{13} 1 2 4 7 8 13 22 28 33 35 43 44 69 118 124 157 201 346 438 556 565 579 771 788 892^{mg} 1005 1071 1241 1424 1582 2358 2372 𝔐 Lect it^{c,e,f,q} syr^{h}
ενδεκατην (the eleventh) — א B D L Θ 085 700 892* it^{a,b,ff^{2},g^{1},h} vg syr^{s,c} Cyril

Matthew 20:6

εστωτας αργους (standing around idle) — C* E F G H K M S U W X Y Γ Δ Π Ω f^{1} f^{13} 1 2 4 7 8 13 22 28 35 43 44 69 118 124 157 201 346 438 556 579 771 788 1005 1071 1241 1424 1582 2358 2372 𝔐 Lect it^{b,f,h,q} syr^{p,h,pal}
εστωτας (standing around) — א B C^{c} D L Θ 085^{vid} 33 372 565 700 892 2737 lat syr^{s,c} cop Origen

Matthew 20:7

αμπελωνα μου και ο εαν η δικαιον ληψεσθε (my vineyard, and whatever will be received by you^{pl} is just) — C^{c} N Π 174 346 565 828 1241 it^{f,h} syr^{c}
αμπελωνα και ο εαν η δικαιον ληψεσθε (the vineyard, and whatever will be received by you^{pl} is just) — C* E F G H K M S U X Y Γ Δ Ω 7 8 22 (28) 33 35 43 44 (69) 118 124 157 201 438 556 (579) 700 771 788 1005 1071 1424 1582^{mg} 2358 2372 𝔐 Lect it^{q} syr^{p,h,pal^{ms}} cop^{bo^{(mss)}}
αμπελωνα και ο εαν η δικαιον λημψεσθαι (the vineyard, and whatever is to be received by you^{pl} is just) — W 2 4 13 892^{mg}
αμπελωνα μου (my vineyard) — D Z 085 372 2737 it^{a,b,d,e,ff^{1},ff^{2},g^{1},l,n,r^{1}} vg^{mss} syr^{s} cop^{sa,mae-2} Cyril
αμπελωνα (vineyard) — א B L Θ f^{1} 1 892* 1582* it^{c} vg^{mss} cop^{bo^{mss},mae-1}

Matthew 20:8

αποδος αυτοις (pay them) — B D E F G H K M N S U W X Y Γ Δ Θ Π Ω f^{1} f^{13} 1 2 4 7 8 13 22 28 33^{vid} 35 43 44 69 118 124 157 201 346 372 438 556 565 579 700 771 788 892 1005 1071 1241 1424 1582 2358 2372 2737 latt syr 𝔐 Lect
αποδος (pay) — א C L Z 085 Origen

Matthew 20:9

verse omitted — 372

Matthew 20:10

και αυτοι (they also) — omitted by 085^{vid} it^{d}

Matthew 20:12

της ημερας και (of the day and) — omitted by 700

Matthew 20:13

συνεφωνησα σοι (I agreed with you) — L Z 33 713 892 syr^{s} cop^{sa^{mss},bo}
συνεφωνησας μοι (you agreed with me) — rell

Matthew 20:14

θελω δε και (but I want also) — E 118 1424 it^{a,b,c,f,ff^{2},g^{1},h,q}
θελω εγω (I want) — B
θελω δε (but I want) — rell

Matthew 20:15

η ουκ (should it not be) — א C E F G H K M N O S U W X Y Γ Δ Π Σ Ω 085 f^{1} f^{13} 1 4 7 8 13 22 28 33 35 43 44 69 118 124 157 180 201 205 346 372 438 556 565 579 597 700 788 892 1005 1006 1009 1010 1071 1079 1195 1216 1230 1241 1242 1243 1253 1292 1342 1344 1365 1424 1505 1546 1582 1646 2148 2174 2358 2372 2737 𝔐 Lect lat syr^{p,h,pal^{mss}} cop geo slav Origen^{lat} Chrysostom Nilus Augustine
ουκ (not) — B D L Z Θ 700 𝑙^{1016} it^{d} syr^{s,c,pal^{ms}} eth

Matthew 20:15

ει ο οφθαλμος μου πονηρος εστιν (If my eye is bad) — 69*
ει οφθαλμος σου πονηρος εστιν (If your eye is bad) — 1 1582
ει ο οφθαλμος σου πονηρος εστιν (If your eye is bad) — B^{c} H S Γ f^{13} 7 8 13 22 28 35 43 44 69 118 124 157 201 346 372 438 556 700 788 1005 1071 2372 2737 𝔐^{pt}
η ο οφθαλμος σου πονηρος εστιν (Or, is your eye bad) — א B* C D E F G K L M N U W X Y Z Δ Θ Π Ω 085 2 4 565 579 892 1424 2358 𝔐^{pt} Lect

Matthew 20:16

πρωτοι εσχατοι πολλοι γαρ εισιν κλητοι ολιγοι δε εκλεκτοι (the first, last; for many are called, but few chosen) — C D E F G H K M N^{vid} O S U W X Y Γ Δ (Θ) Π Σ Ω 0300 f^{1} f^{13} 1 2 7 8 13 22 (28) 33 35 43 44 69 118 124 157 180 201 205 372 438 556 565 597 700 771 788 892^{mg} 1005 1006 1010 1071 1241 1243^{c} 1292 1505 1582 2358 2372 2737 𝔐 Lect latt syr cop^{bo^{mss},mae-1} arm eth geo slav Chrysostom Jerome
πρωτοι εσχατοι γαρ εισιν κλητοι ολιγοι δε εκλεκτοι (the first, last; for they are called, but few chosen) — 346 579
πρωτοι εσχατοι (the first, last) — א B L Z 085 4 5 36 75* 141 278 423* 571 797 892* 1093 1243* 1342 1403 (1424) 1574 1675* 2418* 𝑙^{844} cop^{sa,bo^{mss},mae-2} Diatessaron

Matthew 20:17

μελλων δε αναβαινειν Ιησους (But Jesus, intending to go up) — B syr^{p} cop^{sa^{mss},bo^{ms}}
μελλων δε ο Ιησους αναβαινειν (But intending to go up, Jesus) — 1 1582 Origen^{pt}
και αναβαινων (And going up) — 543 826 828 it^{e,ff^{1}}
και αναβαινων ο Ιησους (And Jesus, going up) — א C D E F G H K L M N S U W X Y Z Γ Δ Θ Π Ω 085 2 4 7 8 (13) 22 28 33 35 43 44 69 118 124 157 201 346 438 556 565 579 700 771 788 892 1005 1009 1010 1071 1079 1195 1216 1230 1241 1242 1253 1344 1365 1424 1546 1646 2148 2174 2358 2372 𝔐 Lect lat syr^{s,c,h} arm eth geo Origen^{(pt)} Chrysostom
αναβαινων ο Ιησους (Jesus, going up) — 𝑙^{76} 𝑙^{333} 𝑙^{950} 𝑙^{1579} 𝑙^{1761}
τω καιρω εκεινω αναβαινων ο κυριος ημων Ιησους Χριστος (At that time, our lord Jesus Christ was going up) — 𝑙^{844}

Matthew 20:17

τους δωδεκα μαθητας αυτου (his twelve disciples) — Γ 7 13 28^{c} 346 713 828 892^{mg} 1010 1216 1342 1424 Lect^{pt} it^{a,aur,c,(e),ff^{1},g^{1},n} vg^{mss} syr^{p} cop^{sa^{mss}} eth^{ms} Origen^{lat} Jerome
τους δωδεκα μαθητας (the twelve disciples) — B C E F G H K M N O S U W X Y Δ Π Σ Ω 085 4 8 22 28* 33 35 43 44 69 118 124 157 180 201 205 372 438 556 565 579 597 700 771 1005 1006 1009 1071 1079 1195 1230 1241 1242 1243 1253 1292 1344 1365 1505 1546 1646 2148 2174 2358 2372 2737 𝔐 Lect^{pt} it^{b,f,ff^{2},h,l,q} vg^{mss} syr^{h} cop^{sa^{mss},mae-1} geo^{mss} slav Hilary Chrysostom^{lem} Augustine
τους δωδεκα αυτου (his twelve) — Codex Schøyen
τους δωδεκα (the twelve) — א D L Z^{vid} Θ f^{1} f^{13} 1 788 892* 1582 it^{d} syr^{s,c} cop^{bo} arm eth^{ms} geo^{mss} Origen^{gr}

Matthew 20:17

εν τη οδω (on the way) — omitted by 1424 𝑙^{10} it^{aur,b,ff^{1},ff^{2},g^{1},l} vg Hilary

Matthew 20:18

εις χειρας ανθρωπων αμαρτωλων (into sinful men's hands) — 28
τοις αρχιερευσιν (to the archpriests) — 085*
τοις αρχιερευσιν και γραμματευσιν (to the archpriests and scribes) — rell

Matthew 20:18

κατακρινουσιν αυτου θανατον (they will judicially decree his death) — 700
κατακρινουσιν αυτον εις θανατον (they will condemn him into death) — א
κατακρινουσιν αυτον (they will condemn him) — B
κατακρινουσιν αυτων θανατω (they themselves will condemn (him) to death) — 579
κατακρινουσιν αυτον θανατω (they will condemn him to death) — rell

Matthew 20:19

και (and) — X 4
και σταυρωσαι (and to crucify) — א*
και σταυρωσαι και θανατωσαι και (and to crucify, and to put to death, and) — 28
και σταυρωσαι και (and to crucify, and) — rell

Matthew 20:19

αναστησεται (he will be stood upright) — B C^{c} D E G H K M S U W X Y Γ Δ Θ Π Ω 085 f^{1} f^{13} 1 2 4 7 8 13 22 28 33 35 43 44 69 118 124 157 201 346 372 438 556 700 771 788 1005 1071 1241 1424 1582 2358 2372 2737 𝔐 Lect
εγερθησεται (he will be raised) — א C* L N Z 579 892 it Origen

Matthew 20:20

απ'/παρ' αυτου (from him) — omitted by 085

Matthew 20:21

ο δε ειπεν αυτοις (But he said to them) — E*
ο δε Ιησους ειπεν αυτη (But Jesus said to her) — L
ο δε ειπεν αυτη (But he said to her) — rell

Matthew 20:21

η δε ειπεν αυτω (But she replied to him) — 118 209
η δε ειπεν (But she replied) — B 565 it^{mss} cop^{sa}
η δε λεγει αυτω (But she says to him) — M N it^{e}
λεγει αυτω και (She says to him, "And) — 579
λεγει αυτω (She says to him) — rell

Matthew 20:21

ουτοι (these) — omitted by C it^{mss}

Matthew 20:21

δεξιων (right) — א B X Origen
δεξιων σου (your right) — rell

Matthew 20:21

ευωνυμων (left) — D E Θ f^{1} 1 22 33 372 565 1582* it^{aur,b,c,d,e,ff^{1},ff^{2},r^{1}} vg^{mss} cop^{mae} arm Origen
ευωνυμων σου (your left) — rell

Matthew 20:22

και το βαπτισμα ο εγω βαπτιζομαι βαπτισθηναι (and to be baptized with the baptism that I am being baptized) — S 2 118 157 (180) 556 892 (1005) 1071 1582^{mg} 𝑙^{673} cop^{bo^{mss}} eth^{mss} geo^{mss} Chrysostom
η το βαπτισμα ο εγω βαπτιζομαι βαπτισθηναι (or to be baptized with the baptism that I am being baptized) — C E G H K M N O S U W X Y Γ Δ Π Σ Φ Ω 0197 4 7 8 13 28 33 35 43 44 69 124 201 205 346 438 565 579 700 771 828 1006 1010 1241 1243 1292 1342 1424 1505 2358 2372 𝔐 Lect it^{(f),h,q} syr^{p,h} arm geo^{mss} slav Marcus^{per Irenaeus} Origen^{lat}
text omitted — א B D L Z Θ 085 1 22 372 788 1582* 2737 lat syr^{s,c} cop^{sa,bo^{mss},mae} eth^{mss} Diatessaron Ambrose Jerome Augustine Speculum

Matthew 20:23

λεγει αυτοις το μεν βαπτισμα ο εγω βαπτιζομαι βαπτισθησεσθε και (He says to them, "Indeed, you^{pl} will be baptized with the baptism that I am being baptized, and") — 1424
και λεγει αυτοις ο Ιησους (And Jesus says to them) — Δ^{(*)} 7 13 69 157 it^{h} cop^{bo}
και λεγει αυτοις (And he says to them) — C E G H K L M N S U W X Y Γ Π Ω 085 2 4 8 22 28 33 35 44 201^{c} 438 556 565 579 892 1071 1241 2358 𝔐 Lect it^{q} syr^{h}
λεγει αυτοις ο Ιησους (Jesus says to them) — D Δ^{c} Θ 124 346 788 it^{a,b,c,e,ff^{2}} syr^{s,c} cop^{mae}
λεγει αυτοις (He says to them) — א B Z f^{1} 1 43 118 201* 700 1005 1582 2372 it^{f,g^{1}} syr^{p} cop^{sa}

Matthew 20:23

πιεσθε και το βαπτισμα ο εγω βαπτιζομαι βαπτισθηναι (you^{pl} will drink, and you^{pl} will be baptized with the baptism that I am being baptized) — C E G (H) (K) M N S U W X Y Γ Δ Π Ω 0197 2 4 7 8 13 28 33^{vid} 35 43 44 (69) 118 124 157 201 346^{vid} 438 556 565 579 700 771 (892) 1005 1071 1241 1582^{mg} 2358 2372 𝔐 Lect it^{b,f,h,q} syr^{p,h} cop^{bo^{mss}}
πιεσθε (you^{pl} will drink) — א B D L Z Θ 085 1 22 372 788 1582* 2737 lat syr^{s,c} cop^{sa,bo^{mss},mae}

Matthew 20:23

και εξ ευωνυμων μου τουτο (and that one at my left) — U
και εξ ευωνυμων τουτο (and that one at the left) — 565
και εξ ευωνυμων μου (and at my left) — E G H W X Γ Π^{c} 2 4 7 8 22 35 43 44 69 118 201 556 700 771 788 1241 2358 𝔐^{pt} syr^{s,c}
και ευωνυμων μου (and my left) — Δ
και εξ ευωνυμων (and at the left) — א C D K M N S Y Z Π* Ω 085 f^{13} 13 28 124 157 346 372 438 579 892 1005 1071 1582* 2372 2737 𝔐^{pt} it^{g^{1},q} arm
η εξ ευωνυμων μου (or at my left) — it^{c,h,l} 1582^{mg}
η εξ ευωνυμων (or at the left) — B L Θ 1 33 1424 it^{a,b,e,f,ff^{2}} vg^{mss} cop^{sa,bo^{mss},mae} Origen Epiphanius

Matthew 20:23

παρα του πατρος μου (from my father) — 700 1005 1424
απο του πατρος μου (from my father) — L
text omitted — 7 𝑙^{339}
υπο του πατρος μου (by my father) — rell

Matthew 20:24

ηρξαντο αγανακτιν (they began to be resentful) — א
ηγανακτησαν (they resented) — rell

Matthew 20:26

ουχ ουτω δε εσται εν υμιν (But it will not be thus among you^{pl}) — 085 syr^{c}
ουχ ου δε εσται εν ημιν (But of which it will not be among us) — 579
ουχ ουτως εσται εν υμιν τοις φιλοις μου (It will not be like this among you^{pl}, my friends) — 1071
ουχ ουτως δε εσται υμιν (But it will not be like this for you^{pl}) — 201
ουχ ουτως εσται υμιν (It will not be like this for you^{pl}) — 35
ουχ ουτως εστε εν υμιν (Let it not be like this among you^{pl}) — א Δ
ουχ ουτος εσται εν υμιν (It will not be thus among you^{pl}) — K 13
ουχ ουτως δε εσται εν υμιν (But it will not be like this among you^{pl}) — C M X Γ 7 8 28 33 35 43 438 556 892 1424 1582^{c} 2358 𝔐^{pt} it^{ff^{2}}
ουχ ουτως εσται εν υμιν (It will not be like this among you^{pl}) — E G H K L N O S U W Y Θ Π Ω f^{1} 1 2 4 22 44 69 118 124 157 180 205 346 565*^{vid} 597 700 771 788 1005 1006 1010 1241 1243 1292 1342 1505 1582* 2372 𝔐^{pt} Lect lat cop^{sa^{mss},bo,mae} arm eth geo^{mss} slav Origen^{lat} Jerome
ουχ ουτως εστιν εν υμιν (It is not like this among you^{pl}) — B D Z 0281 it^{d} cop^{sa^{mss}} geo^{mss} Speculum

Matthew 20:26

αλλ' ος αν θελη εν υμιν μεγας γενεσθαι εσται υμων διακονος (Instead, whoever among you^{pl} is wanting to become great will be your^{pl} servant) — omitted by E*

Matthew 20:26

εστε υμων διακονος (he is to be your^{pl} servant) — א^{*} D
εστω υμων διακονος (let him be your^{pl} servant) — א^{c} H L M S 2 4 43 44 28 157 438 892 1005 1010 1071 2372 𝔐^{pt} it^{f,g^{1}} vg syr^{c} cop^{sa^{ms}bo,mae}
εσται υμων διακονος (he will be your^{pl} servant) — B C E^{mg} G K U W X Y Δ Θ Π Ω 085 f^{1} f^{13} 1 7 8 13 22 33 35 69 118 124 201 346 556 565* 579 700 771 788 1424 1582 2358 𝔐^{pt} Lect it^{a,b,c,e,ff^{2},h,q} cop^{sa^{mss}}

Matthew 20:27

εσται παντων δουλος (he will be bondservant of all) — M
εστε υμων δουλος (he is to be your^{pl} bondservant) — א D
εστω υμων δουλος (let him be your^{pl} bondservant) — B E G H S X Y Γ Π^{c} Ω 2 7 8 22 28 43 44 438 556 579 1005 1010 1071 1424 2358 2372 𝔐^{pt} syr^{c} cop^{bo,mae}
εσται υμων δουλος (he will be your^{pl} bondservant) — 𝔓^{45}^{vid} C K L N U W Δ Θ Π* 085 f^{1} f^{13} 1 4 13 33 35 69 118 124 157 201 346 565 700 771 788 892 1582 𝔐^{pt} Lect lat cop^{sa}

Matthew 20:28

πολλων υμεις δε ζητειτε εκ μικρου αυξησαι και εκ μειζονος ελαττον ειναι εισερχομενοι δε και παρακληθεντες δειπνησαι μη ανακλεινεσθαι εις τους εξεχοντας τοπους μηποτε ενδοξοτερος σου επελθη και προσελθων ο δειπνοκλητωρ ειπη σοι ετι κατω χωρει και καταισχυνθηση εαν δε αναπεσης εις τον ηττονα τοπον και επελθη σου ηττων ερει σοι ο δειπνοκλητωρ συναγε ετι ανω και εσται σοι τουτο χρησιμον (many. But seek ye to increase from the least, and to be greater from among the lesser. But upon entering and being invited to dine, do not recline among the preeminent places, lest someone more reputable than you comes and the dinner host approaching should say to you, "Take a place further down," and you will be humiliated. But if you recline in the lesser place and someone lesser than you comes, the dinner host will say to you, "Congregate further up," and this will be useful to you.) — D it^{a,aur,b,c,d,e,ff^{1},ff^{2},g^{2},h,n,r^{1},r^{2}} vg^{mss} syr^{p^{ms},h^{mg}}
πολλων υμεις δε ζητειτε εκ μικρου αυξησαι και μη εκ μειζονος ελαττον ειναι παρακληθεντες δειπνησαι μη ανακλινεσθε εις τον εξεχοντα τοπον μηποτε ενδοξοτερος σου επελθη και ο δειπνοκλητωρ ειπη σοι κατω χωρει και καταισχυνθηση ενωπιον των ανακειμενων εαν δε αναπεσης εις τον ηττονα τοπον και επελθη σου ηττων ερει σοι ο δειπνοκλητωρ συναγε ετι ανω και εσται σοι και εσται σοι δοξα ενδοξοτερος ενωπιον των ανακειμενων (many. But seek ye to increase from the least, and not to be lesser from greater. Upon being invited to dine, do not recline^{pl} in the preeminent place, lest someone more reputable than you comes and the dinner host should say to you, "Take a place lower," and you will be humiliated in the presence of those who are reclining. But if you recline in the lesser place and someone lesser than you comes, the dinner host will say to you, "Congregate further up," and it will be an honor to you, something reputable in the presence of those who are reclining.) — syr^{c}
πολλων υμεις δε ζητειτε εκ μικρου αυξησαι εκ μειζονος ελαττον ειναι εισερχομενοι δε και παρακληθεντες δειπνησαι μη εις τους εξεχοντας τοπους ανακλινεσθε μηποτε ενδοξοτερος σου επελθη και προσελθων ο δειπνοκλητωρ ειπη σοι ετι κατω χωρει και καταισχυνθηση εαν δε αναπεσης εις τον ηττονα τοπον και επελθη σου ηττων ερει σοι ο δειπνοκλητωρ αγε ετι ανω και εσται σοι τουτο χρησιμωτερον (many. But seek ye to increase from the least, to be greater from among the lesser. But upon entering and being greeted, do not recline^{pl} to dine among the preeminent places, lest someone more reputable than you comes and the dinner host approaching should say to you, "Take a place further down," and you will be humiliated. But if you recline in the lesser place and someone lesser than you comes, the dinner host will say to you, "Come further up," and this will be more useful to you.) — Φ
πολλων υμεις δε ζητειτε εκ μικρου αυξησαι και εκ μειζονος ελαττον ειναι εισερχομενοι δε και παρακληθεντες δειπνησαι μη ανακλεινεσθαι εις τους εξεχοντας τοπους μηποτε ενδοξοτερος σου επελθη και προσελθων ο δειπνοκλητωρ ειπη σοι κατω χωρει και καταισχυνθηση εαν δε αναπεσης εις τον ηττονα τοπον και επελθη σου ηττων ερει σοι ο δειπνοκλητωρ συναγε ετι ανω και εσται σοι και εσται σοι δοξα ενδοξοτερος ενωπιον των ανακειμενων (many. But seek ye to increase from the least, and to be greater from among the lesser. But upon entering and being invited to dine, do not recline among the preeminent places, lest someone more reputable than you comes and the dinner host approaching should say to you, "Take a place lower," and you will be humiliated. But if you recline in the lesser place and someone lesser than you comes, the dinner host will say to you, "Congregate further up," and it will be an honor to you, something reputable in the presence of those who are reclining.) — it^{e}
πολλων υμεις δε ζητειτε εκ μικρου αυξησαι και εκ μειζονος μειζον γενεσθαι (many. But seek ye to increase from the least, even to become greater from the greater) — it^{g^{1},m}
πολλων υμεις δε ζητειτε εκ μικρου αυξησαι και εκ μειζονος ελαττον ειναι (many. But seek ye to increase from the least, and to be greater from among the lesser) — it^{f,q}
πολλων (many) — rell

Matthew 20:29

εκπορευομενου του Ιησου (Jesus departed) — C^{c} G 2^{c} 4 it^{e} 𝑙^{339} 𝑙^{(1086)}
εκπορευομενου αυτου (he departed) — H Δ 7 33
εκπορευομενων αυτων (they departed) — rell

Matthew 20:29

ηκολουθησαν οχλοι πολλοι (many throngs followed^{pl}) — 𝔓^{45}^{vid}
ηκολουθησεν οχλος πολυς (a large crowd followed^{sg}) — א*
ηκολουθησαν αυτω οχλοι πολλοι (many throngs followed^{pl} him) — D 1424 it^{c,e,q} vg^{mss} syr^{h} cop^{bo^{mss}}
ηκολουθησαν αυτω οχλος πολυς (a large crowd followed^{pl} him) — Γ 4 1241
ηκολουθησεν αυτω οχλος πολυς (a large crowd followed^{sg} him) — rell

Matthew 20:30

κυριε ελεησον ημας Ιησους (Lord! Have mercy on us, Jesus) — L 892 syr^{pal^{mss}} cop^{sa^{mss},bo^{(mss)}}
κυριε ελεησον ημας (Lord! Have mercy on us) — B Z^{vid} 085 0281 372 (2737) it^{aur,g^{1},l,r^{1}} vg cop^{sa^{mss},bo^{(ms)}} eth^{mss} Jerome Augustine
ελεησον ημας κυριε Ιησους (Have mercy on us, Lord, Jesus) — N Σ 124 1689 syr^{pal^{mss}}
ελεησον ημας κυριε (Have mercy on us, Lord) — 𝔓^{45}^{vid} C E G H K M O S U W X Y Γ Δ Π Ω 1 2 4 7 8 22 28 33 35 43 44 180 201 438 556 579 597 771 1005 1006 1009 1010 1071 1079 1195 1216 1230 1241 1242 1243 1253 1292 1342 1365 1424 1505 1546 1582 1646 2138 2174 2358 2372 𝔐 Lect it^{f,q} syr^{p,h} cop^{sa^{ms}} eth^{mss} geo^{ms} slav Origen Chrysostom^{lem} John-Damascus
ελεησον κυριε (Show mercy, Lord) — 1344
ελεησον ημας Ιησους (Have mercy on us, Jesus) — א Θ 13 69 700 788 𝑙^{547} it^{c,e,h,n} syr^{pal^{ms}} Codex Schøyen arm geo^{mss}
ελεησον ημας (Have mercy on us) — D 118 157 205 209 346 565 1346 𝑙^{76}^{vid} 𝑙^{1016} it^{a,b,d,ff^{1},ff^{2}} syr^{c} cop^{sa^{ms},mae-1} eth^{ms}

Matthew 20:31

verse omitted — 2* 157

Matthew 20:31

πολλω μαλλον (much more) — א
περισσως (all the more) — 1071
μειζον ως (greater like it) — 1424
πλεον (more) — Δ
μειζον or μειζων (greater) — rell

Matthew 20:31

εκραυγασαν (they shouted) — 𝔓^{45} 13 788
εκραυγαζον (they were shouting) — Θ Φ 69 124 346
εκραζον (they were crying out) — א^{c} C E G H K M N S U W X Y Γ Δ Π^{c} Ω f^{1} 1 2^{c} 4 7 8 22 28 33 35 43 44 118 201 372 438 556 565 579 771 1005 1071 1241 1424 1582 2358 2372 2737 𝔐 Lect latt
εκραξαν (they cried out) — א B D L Z Π* 085 0281 700 892

Matthew 20:31

κυριε (lord) — omitted by 13 118 205 209 579 700 1675 𝑙^{1016} it^{e} vg^{ms} syr^{pal^{mss}} slav^{mss}

Matthew 20:32

ειπεν (said) — 346
text omitted — 579
και ειπεν (and he said) — rell

Matthew 20:32

τι θελε ποιησω υμιν (You wish I do what to you^{pl}?!?) — 1071
τι θελεις ποιησω υμιν (What are you wishing I do to you^{pl}?) — C
τι θελεται ινα ποιησω υμιν (What do you wish that I do to you^{pl}?) — 579
τι θελεται ποιησω υμιν (What do you wish I do to you^{pl}?) — D W Θ 2
τι θελετε ποιησαι με υμιν (What are you^{pl} wanting me to do to you^{pl}?) — 28 syr^{c}
τι θελετε ινα ποιησω υμιν (What are you^{pl} wishing that I do to you^{pl}?) — א^{c} L 565 it^{c,f,ff^{2},g^{1},h,q}
τι θελετε ποιησω υμιν (What are you^{pl} wishing I do to you^{pl}?) — rell

Matthew 20:33

ινα ανοιγωσιν οι οφθαλμοι υμων και ωστε ηγγισαν εις Ιεροσωλυμα ("that your^{pl} eyes be opened." And so they drew near to Jerusalem.) — 579*
ινα ανοιγωσιν οι οφθαλμοι υμων ("that your^{pl} eyes be opened") — א^{*} 579^{c}
ινα ανοιγωσιν οι οφθαλμοι ημων λεγει αυτοις ο Ιησους πιστευετε οτι δυναμαι τουτο ποιησαι λεγουσιν αυτω ναι κυριε (that our eyes be opened. Jesus says to them, "Are you^{pl} believing that I am able to do this?" They say to him, "Yes sir.") — it^{c}
ινα ανοιγωσιν οι οφθαλμοι ημων και βλεπωμεν σε (that our eyes be opened, and we might see you) — syr^{c}
ινα ανοιγωσιν οι οφθαλμοι ημων (that our eyes be opened) — rell

Matthew 20:34

των ομματων (the eyes) — Θ
των ομματων αυτων (their eyes) — (B) D L Z f^{13} 13 69 124 788 892 it Origen
των οφθαλμων αυτου (his eyes) — א^{*}
των οφθαλμων αυτων (their eyes) — א^{c} C E G H K M N S U W X Y Γ Δ Ω Π f^{1} 1 2 4 7 8 22 28 33 35 43 44 118 157 201 346 372 556 565 579 700 771 1005 1071 1241 1424 1582 2358 2372 2737 𝔐 Lect

Matthew 20:34

ανεβλεψαν αυτων οι οφθαλμοι (their eyes regained eyesight) — C E G H K M N S U W X Y Γ Δ Π Ω 2 4 7 8 13 35 43 44 69 118 124^{c} 157 201 346 438 556 565 579 1005 1071 1241 1424 2358 2372 𝔐 Lect it^{q} syr^{p,h} cop^{sa^{ms}}
ανεβλεψαν (they regained eyesight) — א B D L Z^{vid} Θ f^{1} 1 22 28 33 124* 372 700 788 892 1582 2737 lat syr^{c} cop^{sa^{mss},bo,mae}

24 Textual variants in Matthew 21

Matthew 21:1

ηγγισεν (he approached) — C^{(c)} 892 Lect^{pt} it^{b,e,ff^{2}} vg^{mss} syr^{c,p} cop^{bo^{mss}}
ηγγισαν (they approached) — rell

Matthew 21:1

ηλθεν (he came) — א^{*} C^{c} E S U W Δ 2 28 892 𝔐^{pt} Lect^{pt} it^{e,ff^{2},q} syr^{c,p} cop^{sa^{ms},mae} Origen
ηλθον (they came) — א^{c} B C* D G H K L M N X Y Θ Π Ω f^{1} f^{13} 1 4 7 8 13 22 33 35 43 44 69 118 124 157 201 346 438 556 565 579 700 771 788 1005 1071 1424 1582 2358 2372 lat cop^{sa^{mss},bo}

Matthew 21:1

Βηθφαγη και βηθανιαν και (Bethphage and Bethany and) — C
Βηθφαγη και βηθανιαν (Bethphage and Bethany) — f^{13} 13 33 69 346
Βηθφαγη (Bethphage) — rell

Matthew 21:1

εις το ορος των ελαιων (into the mount of olives) — B C^{(c)} 33 it
text omitted — 28
προς το ορος των ελαιων (toward the mount of olives) — rell

Matthew 21:1

ο κυριος ημων Ιησους ο Χριστος (our lord Jesus Christ) — 𝑙^{844} 𝑙^{2211}
ο Ιησους (Jesus) — א C^{c} G K L M N U W Y Γ Δ Θ Π f^{1} f^{13} 1 4 7 8 13 22^{c} 33 35 43 69 118 124 157 201 346 438 556 565 579 771 788 892 1005 1071 1424 1582 2358 2372 𝔐^{pt} Lect
Ιησους (Jesus) — B C* D E H S X Ω 2 22* 28 44 700
text omitted — 1241

Matthew 21:1

δυο των μαθητων αυτου (two of his disciples) — Θ f^{13} 13 28 33 69 124 157 346 788 1005 it^{b,c,e,f,ff^{2},g^{1},h,q}
δυο μαθητας (two disciples) — rell

Matthew 21:2

ευθυς (straightaway) — א L
text omitted — 482 544 it^{a,b,c,h} syr^{c} cop^{bo}
ευθεως (immediately) — rell

Matthew 21:2

ευρησεται (it will be found) — D W Δ Θ 2 8 1071
ευρησετε (you^{pl} will find) — rell

Matthew 21:3

τι ποιειται ουτως ερειτε (anything, do like this: you^{pl} will say) — 157
τι ποιειται ερειτε (anything, do this: you^{pl} will say) — D it^{d} Eusebius
τι ερειται (anything, it will be said) — L W
τι ερειτε (anything, you^{pl} will say) — rell

Matthew 21:3

αυτων εχει χρειαν εχει (he has need of having them) — D
αυτου χριαν εχει (he has need of it) — א Θ
αυτου χρειαν εχει (he has need of it) — 579
αυτων χρειαν εχει (he has need of them) — rell

Matthew 21:3

και ευθεως (and immediately) — D 33 syr^{c}
και ευθυς (and straightaway) — it
ευθυς δε (but straightaway) — א B L Θ 700 788 892 it^{q}
ευθεως δε (but immediately) — rell

Matthew 21:3

απεστειλεν (he sent away) — 1424 syr^{c}
αποστελη (you will be sent away) — H
αποστελλει (he sends away) — C E G K L N S U W X Y Z Γ Δ Θ Π Ω f^{1} f^{13} 1 4 7 8 2 13 22 28 33 35 43 44 118 124 201 346 438 556 565 579 700^{c} 771 788 892 1071 1241 1582^{c} 2358 2372 𝔐 Lect it^{d,h}
αποστελει (he will send away) — א B D M 69 157 700* 1005 1582* 𝑙^{1} lat cop

Matthew 21:4

ολον γεγονεν (all happened) — B C^{c} E G H K M N S U W X Y Γ Δ Π Ω f^{1} f^{13} 1 2 4 7 8 13 22 28 33 35 43 44 69 118 124 157 201 346 438 556 565 579 700 771 788 1005 1071 1424 1582 2358 2372 𝔐 Lect it^{q} vg^{mss} syr^{h} cop^{sa,bo^{ms},mae-1} arm geo
γεγονεν (happened) — א C* D L Z Θ 372 892 1241 2737 𝑙^{844} 𝑙^{2211} it vg^{mss} syr^{c,p} cop^{bo} Origen

Matthew 21:4

υπο του προφητου (by the prophet) — L Z Θ f^{13} 13 69 124 700 788 892 syr^{c}
δια του ζαχαριου προφητου (through Zechariah the prophet) — M^{mg} 42 it^{a,c,h} cop^{bo^{ms}} Chrysostom Hilary
δια Ησαιου προφητου (through Isaiah the prophet) — it^{r^{2}} vg^{mss} cop^{bo^{ms}} eth
δια του προφητου (through the prophet) — rell

Matthew 21:5

επι πωλον ονον νεον υποζυγιον (upon a foal, a young donkey, a draft animal) — it^{b}
επι πωλον υιον ονου (upon a foal, a son of a donkey) — Codex Schøyen
επι ονον και επι πωλον νεον (upon a donkey – even upon a young foal) — 1 1582 Origen^{pt}
επι ονον πωλον υιον υποζυγιου (upon a donkey, a foal, a son of a draft animal) — 69
επι ονον και πωλον υιον υποζυγιου (upon a donkey – even a foal, a son of a draft animal) — C D E F G H K M S U W X Y Γ Δ Θ Π Ω f^{13} 2 4 7 8 13 22 28 33 35 43 44 118 157 201 346 372 438 556 565 579 771 788 892 1005 1071 1241 1424 2358 2372 2737 𝔐 Lect lat cop^{bo,mae-1} Origen^{pt}
επι ονον και επι πωλον υποζυγιου (upon a donkey – even upon a foal of a draft animal) — א^{c} L Z^{vid} it^{e}
επι ονον και επι πωλον υιον υποζυγιου (upon a donkey – even upon a foal, a son of a draft animal) — א^{*} B N 124 700 𝑙^{844} syr cop^{sa}

Matthew 21:6

εποιησαν (they did) — D it
και ποιησαντες (and upon them doing) — rell

Matthew 21:6

ως (as) — 565
καθα (exactly as) — G 157
καθως (accordingly) — rell

Matthew 21:6

συνεταξεν (coordinated) — B C D 33 700 it
προσεταξεν (ordered) — rell

Matthew 21:6

ο Ιησους (Jesus) — omitted by 28 579

Matthew 21:7

αυτω (it) — f^{13}
επ' αυτω (upon it) — Θ 33
επ' αυτον (upon it) — D 𝑙^{2211} it^{a,b,e,f,ff^{2},q}
επ' αυτων (upon them) — א B L Z 69 788 892* it^{c,g^{1},h} syr^{p}
text omitted — syr^{c}
επανω αυτων (over them) — rell

Matthew 21:7

ιματια (cloaks) — א* B D Θ 2^{c} it^{b,e,ff^{1},ff^{2}}
ιματια αυτων (their cloaks) — rell

Matthew 21:7

επεκαθισεν επανω αυτων (he sat on top of them) — B C F H M U X Δ Ω f^{1} f^{13} 7 8 11 13 22 28 33 35 44 69 118 124 157 201 438 500 501 502 771 788 901 1005 1071 1582 1701 2372 𝔐 Lect it^{q}
επεκαθισαν επανω αυτων (they sat on top of them) — 579 vg
επεκαθισαν επανω αυτον (they sat on top of it) — א^{c} L 892
επεκαθισαν επανω αυτης (they sat on top of her) — 2^{c}
εκαθησεν επανω αυτου (he sat down over top of it) — Θ it^{f,h}
εκαθισεν επανω αυτων (he sat down on top of them) — K N S W Y Π 9 10 12 43 490 565 1424
εκαθισεν επανω επ' αυτων (he sat down over upon them) — 556
εκαθισαν επανω αυτων (they sat down on top of them) — 4
εκαθισαν επανω επ' αυτων (they sat down over upon them) — א^{*}
εκαθητο επανω αυτου (he was seated over top of it) — D it^{b,c,e,ff^{2}}
εκαθητο επανω αυτων (he was seated on top of them) — 700 it^{a,g^{1}}
text omitted — E G 1 2^{*} 2358

Matthew 21:9

και εξηλθον εις υπαντησιν αυτω πολλοι χαιροντες και δοξαζοντες τον θεον περι παντων ων ειδον — (Φ) syr^{c}

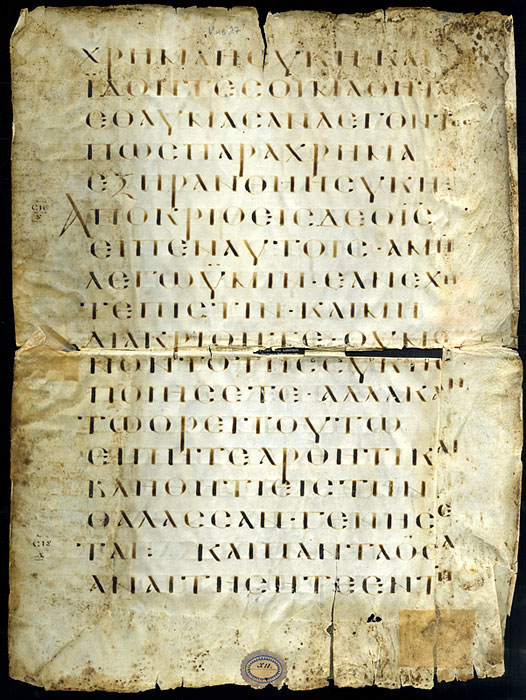
Matthew 21:19-24 from Uncial 087

Matthew 21:23

διδασκοντι (while he was teaching) – omitted by 7 it^{a, b, c, ff^{1}, ff^{2(c)}, h, l, r^{1}} vg^{mss} syr^{s,c} Hippolytus Origen^{pt}

Matthew 21:31

ὁ πρῶτος (the first) — א, C*, K, W, Δ, Π, 𝔐/Byz
ὁ δεύτερος (the second) — 4, 273
ὁ ὕστερος (the latter) — B
ὁ ἔσχατος (the last) — D, Θ, ƒ^{13}

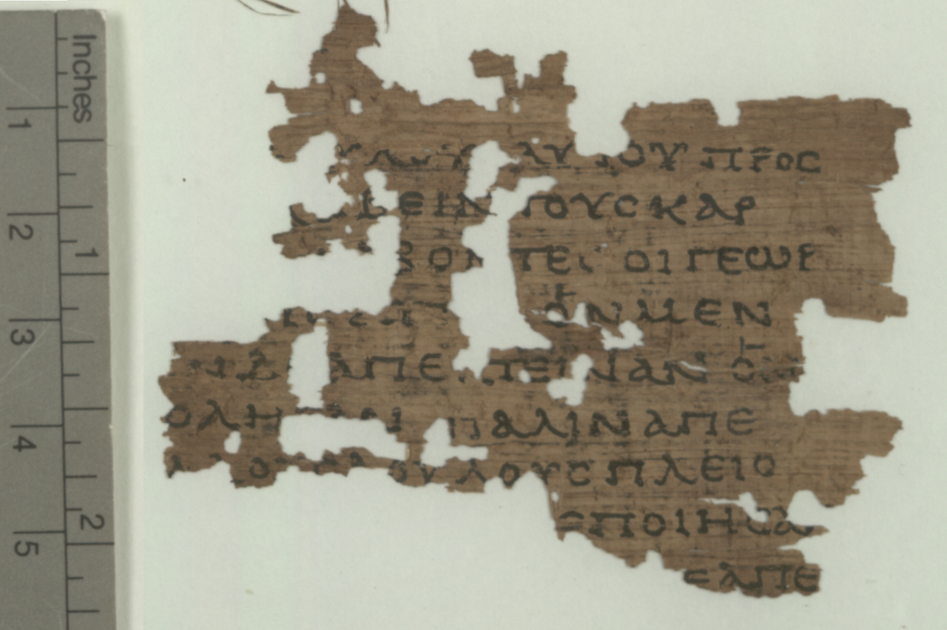
Matthew 21:34-37 in Papyrus 104

Matthew 21:38

σχωμεν — א B D L Z f^{1} 33 pc syr^{s.c}
κατασχωμεν — C W 0138 f^{13} Byz ff^{1} q syr^{p.h}

Matthew 21:44

Καὶ ὁ πεσὼν ἐπὶ τὸν λίθον τοῦτον συνθλασθήσεται ἐφ ὃν δ' ἂν πέσῃ λικμήσει αὐτόν (And he who falls on this stone will be broken to pieces; but when it falls on any one, it will crush him) — א, B, C, K, L, W, X, Δ, Π, 0138, 33, 892, 1010, 1546, f^{1}, f^{13}, 28, 565, 700, 892, 1009, 1010, 1071, 1195, 1216, 1230, 1241, 1242, 1253, 1344, 1365, 1646, 2148, 2174, Byz, Lect, it, vg, syr, cop, arm, eth, geo
ὁ πεσὼν ἐπὶ τὸν λίθον τοῦτον συνθλασθήσεται ἐφ ὃν δ' ἂν πέσῃ λικμήσει αὐτόν — Θ, 1079, 1546
entire verse omitted by 𝔓^{104}, D, 33, it^{a,b,d,e,ff^{1}, ff^{2},r^{1}} syr^{s} Diatessaron^{syr} Irenaeus^{lat}, Origen, Eusebius^{syr}

4 Textual variants in Matthew 22

Matthew 22:10

γαμος (wedding) — B^{1} D W Θ 33 085 0161 ƒ^{1} ƒ^{13} 𝔐/Byz Irenaeus^{lat}
νυμφων (bride) — א B* L 0138 892 1010 𝑙^{102}
αγαμος (unmarried person) — C

Matthew 22:13

δησαντες αυτου χειρας και ποδας αρατε αυτον και εκβαλετε — M 043 565 1241
δησαντες αυτου ποδας και χειρας αρατε αυτον και εκβαλετε — E 1241
δησαντες αυτου ποδας και χειρας εκβαλετε — f^{1}
δησαντες αυτου ποδας και χειρας βαλετε — f^{13}

Matthew 22:30

γαμιζονται — א B D f^{1} 892 1010 1424
εκγαμιζονται — L 0138 0161 0197 Byz
γαμισκονται — W Θ f^{13} 33 700 pc

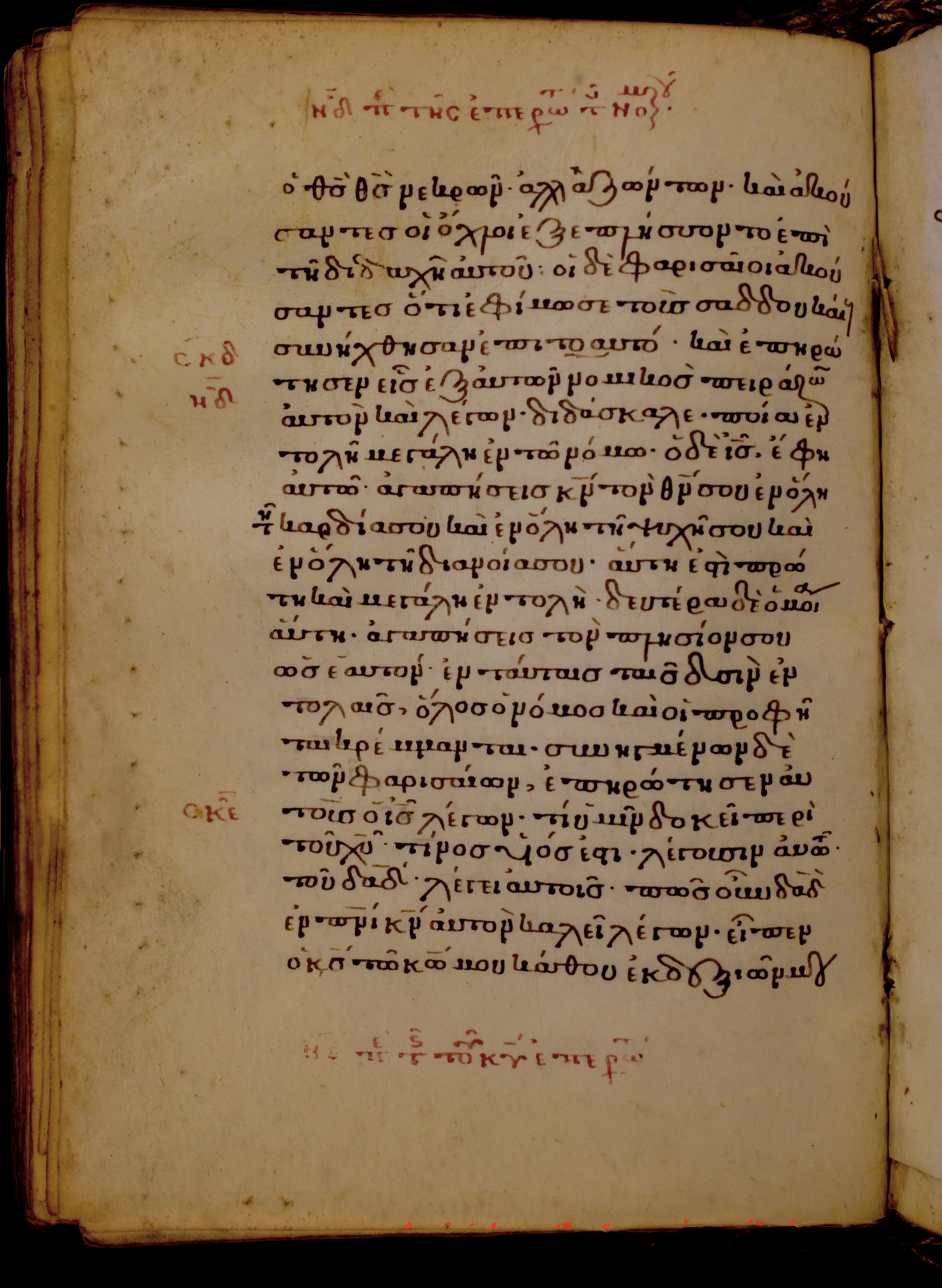
Matthew 22:32-44 from codex 544

Matthew 22:46

ημερας — majority
ωρας — D W f^{13} pc q syr^{s.c} cop^{bo}

2 Textual variants in Matthew 23

Matthew 23:26

καὶ τῆς παροψίδος (and dish) — א, B, C, L, W, 33, syr^{p, h}) 𝔐 cop ƒ^{13}
phrase omitted — D Q 1 118 209 1582 700 a d e ff^{1} r^{1} syr^{s}) geo Irenaeus^{lat} Clement (hiatus: b syr^{cur})

Matthew 23:38

ἔρημος — mss of the Western, Caesarean, Byzantine and some of Alexandrian text-types
word omitted — 𝔓^{77} (?), B, L, 𝑙^{184}

4 Textual variants in Matthew 24

Matthew 24:7

λιμοι και σεισμοι — B D 892 pc it syr^{s} cop^{sa}
λιμοι και λοιμοι και σεισμοι — C Θ 0138 f^{1} f^{13} (565) Byz h q syr^{p.h} mae
λοιμοι και λιμοι και σεισμοι — L W 33 pc lat

Matthew 24:9/24:10

εις θλιψιν — add. by א
εις θανατον — add. by Φ pc

Matthew 24:31

αρχομενων δε τουτων γινεσθαι αναβλεψατε και επαρατε τας κεφαλας υμων, διοτι εγγιζει η απολυτρωσις υμων — add. by D 1093 it

Matthew 24:41

δυο επι κλινης μιας εις παραλαμβανεται και εις αφιεται — D f^{13} pc it vg^{s}

3 Textual variants in Matthew 25

Matthew 25:1

του νυμφιου — א B K L W X^{2} Δ Π f^{13} 28 33 565 700 892^{mg} 1009 1010 1071 1079 1195^{c} 1216 1230 1241 1242^{c} 1253 1344 1365 1546 1646 2148 2174 Byz Lect
τω νυμφιω — C
των νυμφιων — 892*
του νυμφιου και της νυμφης — D X Θ Σ f^{1} 124* 174 1195^{vid} latt syr^{s,p,h**} mae-1 arm geo^{mss} Diatessaron^{mss} Origen Basil

Matthew 25:17

ἐκέρδησεν — א, B, C*, L, 33, 892, 1010, 1546, it^{aur, g^{1}, l}, vg, syr^{p, pal}, cop^{sa, bo}, arm, eth
καὶ αὐτὸς ἐκέρδησεν — D it^{d}
ἐκέδησεν καὶ αὐτός — A, C^{3}, K, W, X, Δ, Θ, Π, 074 ƒ^{1} ƒ^{13}, 28, 565, 700, 1009, 1071, 1079, 1195, 1216, 1230, 1241, 1242, 1253, 1344, 1365, 1646, 2174, 𝔐 Lect it^{h}, syr^{h}

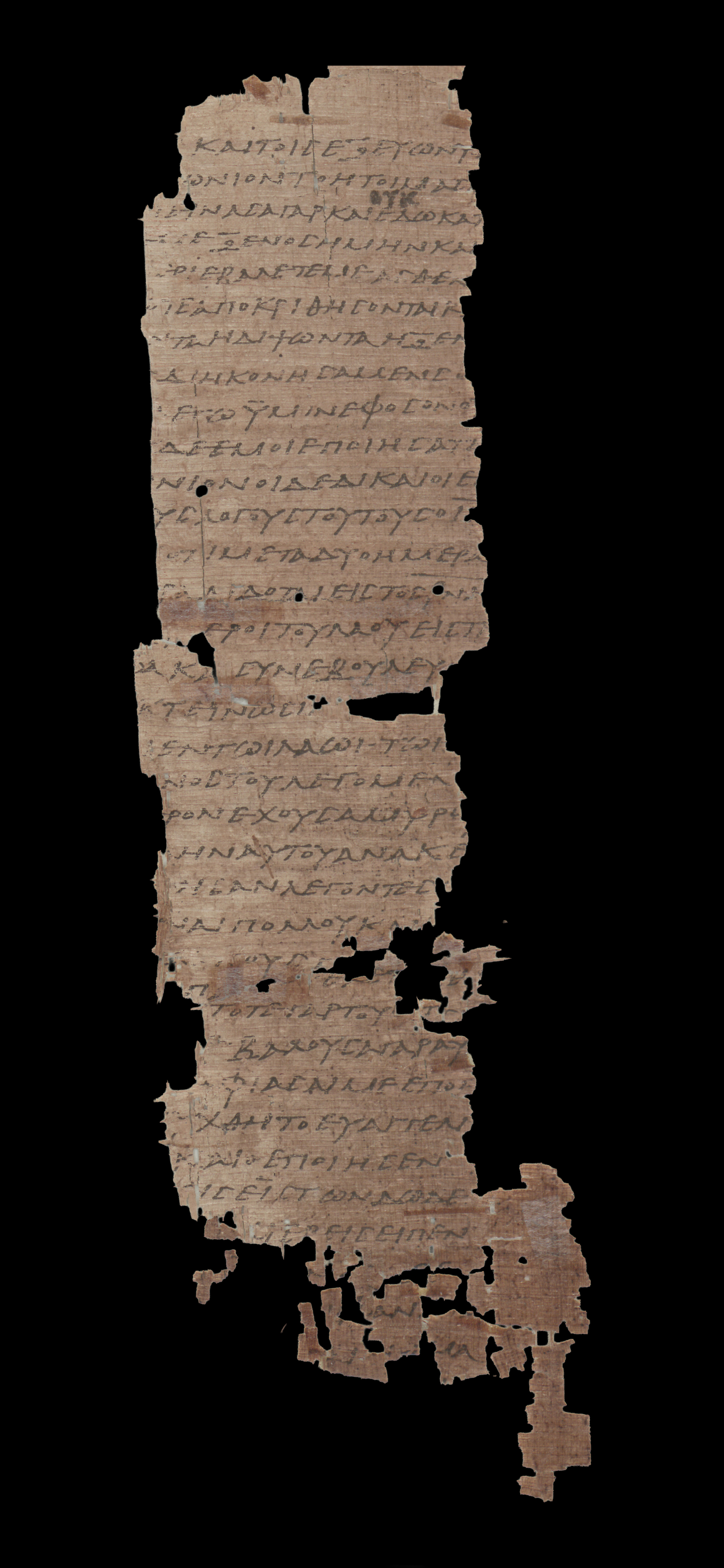
Matthew 25:41-46 from Papyrus 45

Matthew 25:41

το ητοιμασμενον (which has been prepared) — 𝔓^{45} א B K L W Δ Θ Π 067 074 0128 0136 f^{13} 28 33 565 700 892 1010 1071 1079 1195 1216 1230 1241 1242 1253 1365 1546 1646 2148 2174 Byz Lect
τῷ ἡτοιμασμένον (that has been prepared) F
τω ητοιμασμενω (that has been prepared) — 1009 1344 ℓ 1663
ο ητοιμασεν ο πατηρ μου (which my Father prepared) — D f^{1} it^{mss} Justin Martyr Irenaeus^{lat} Origen Cyprian
ο ητοιμασεν ο κυριος (which the Lord prepared) — Clement Tertullian

7 Textual variants in Matthew 26

Matthew 26:3

οι αρχιερεις — 𝔓^{45} א A B D L Θ 089, f^{1}, f^{13}, 565 700 892 1424 al lat syr^{s} cop
οι αρχιερεις και οι γραμματεις — 0133, 0255, Byz it syr^{p.h}
οι αρχιερεις και οι Φαρισαιοι — W

Matthew 26:7

βαρυτιμου – B, W, 089, 0133, 0255, f^{1}, f^{13}, Byz, syr^{h}
πολυτιμου – א, A, D, L, Θ, 33, 700, 892, 1010, 1424

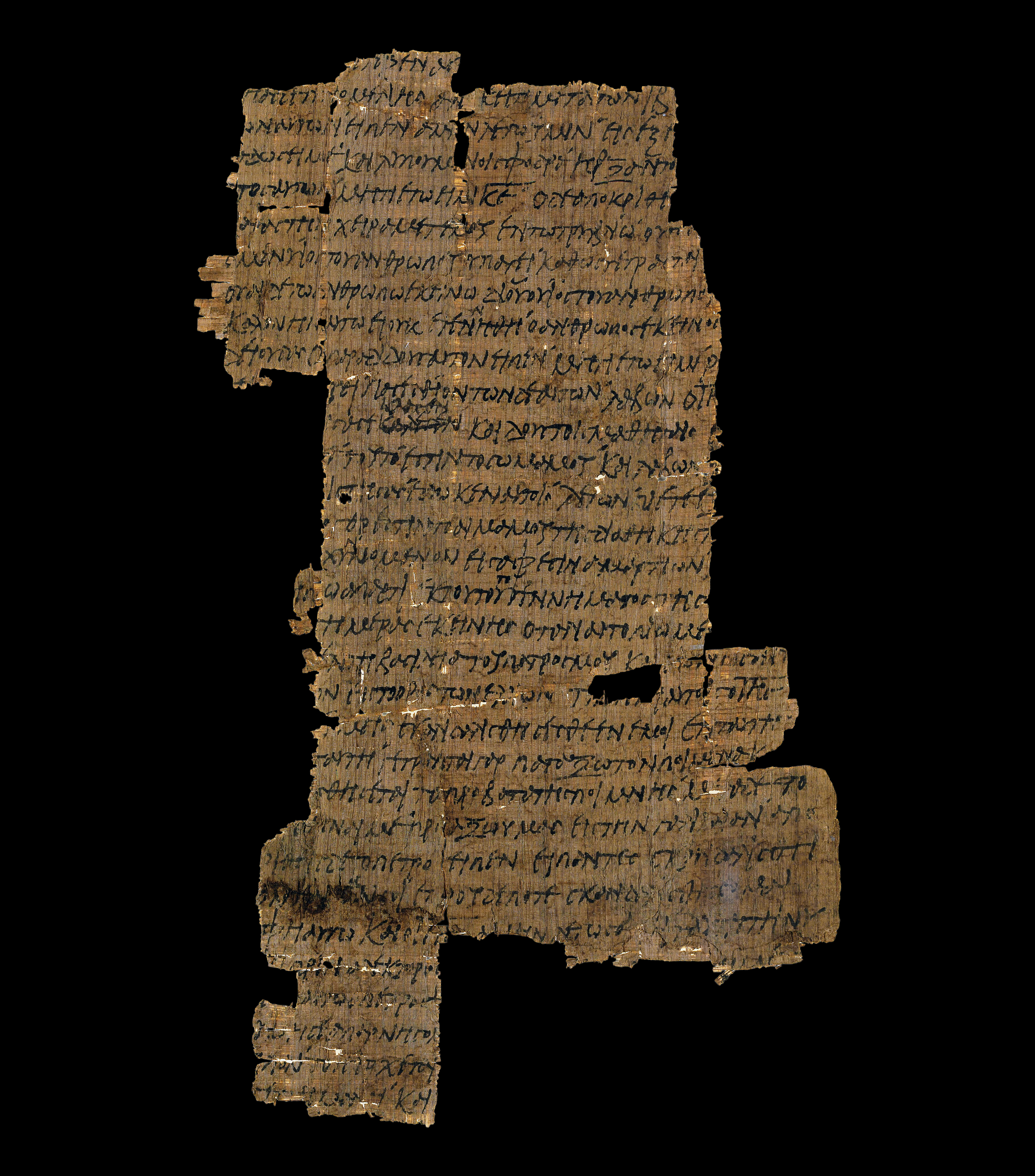
Papyrus 37 recto; fragment Mt 26:19-37, in 26:28 it has variant covenant

Matthew 26:28

τῆς καινῆς διαθήκης (the new covenant) A C D K W Π Δ f^{1} f^{13} Byz latt syr co^{sa, bo} Irenaeus^{lat}
τῆς διαθήκης (the covenant) 𝔓^{37} 𝔓^{45}^{vid} א B L Z Θ 0298^{vid} 33 mae-1 co^{bo^{ms}} Irenaeus^{arm}

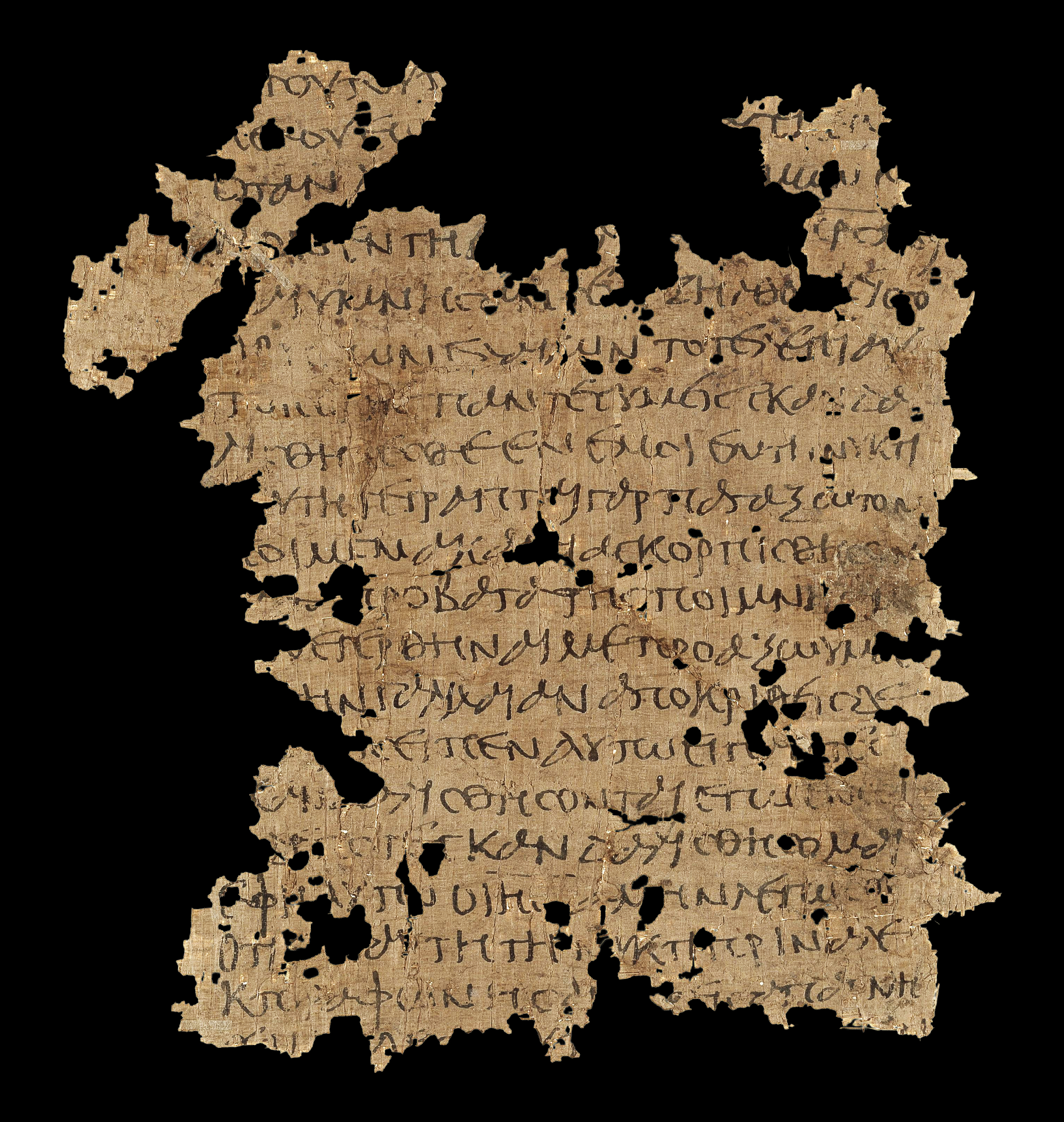
Matthew 26:29-35 from Papyrus 53

Matthew 26:29

πινω – majority of mss.
πιω – 𝔓^{37} D Θ 565

Matthew 26:44

omits text ἐκ τρίτου (out a third time) with 𝔓^{37} A K Π f^{1} 157 565 652 1424 it^{a,b,d,ff^{2},r^{1}}

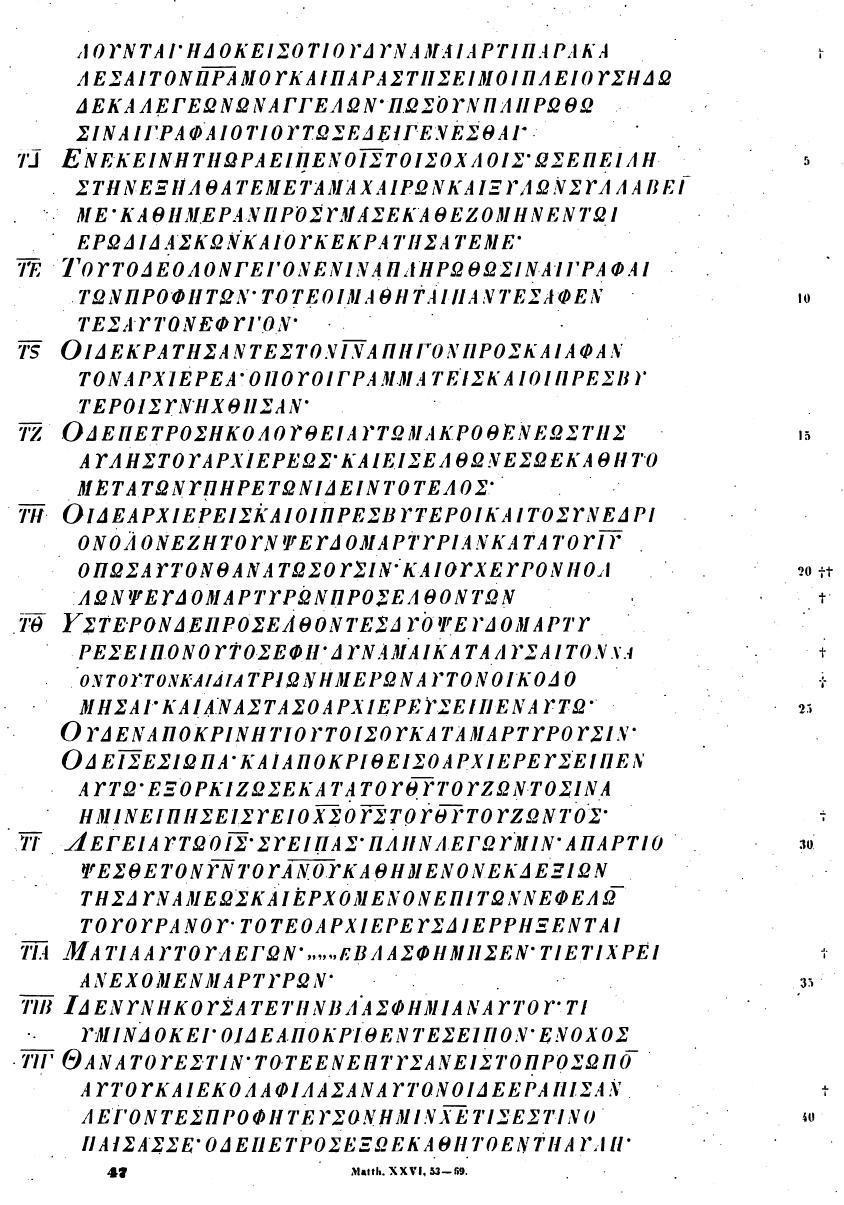
Matthew 26:52-69 from Codex Ephraemi in Tischendorf's facsimile (1843)

Matthew 26:60

ψευδομάρτυρες (false witnesses) (A) C D N W f^{13} 33 1241 Byz latt syr^{(s),h}
omit text — א B L Θ f^{1} syr^{p} co

Matthew 26:71 reads εἶδεν αὐτὸν ἄλλη παιδίσκη (another maidservant saw him) with it^{mss} vg^{mss}

13 Textual variants in Matthew 27

Matthew 27:4

ἀθῷον (innocent) — א B* C K W X Δ Π 𝔐/Byz Lect
δίκαιον (righteous) — B^{2mg} L Θ

Matthew 27:9

ἐπληρώθη τὸ ῥηθὲν διὰ Ἰερεμίου τοῦ προφήτου (fulfilled what was spoken by Jeremiah the prophet) — omitted word Ιερεμιου (Jeremiah) in manuscripts Φ 33 it^{a} it^{b} syr^{s, p} cop^{bo}
ἐπληρώθη τὸ ῥηθὲν διὰ Ζαχαρίου τοῦ προφήτου (fulfilled what was spoken by Zachariah the prophet) — 22 syr^{hmg}
ἐπληρώθη τὸ ῥηθὲν διὰ Ἰησαίου τοῦ προφήτου (fulfilled what was spoken by Isaiah the prophet) — 21

Matthew 27:16

Ἰησοῦν τὸν Βαραββᾶν (Jesus the Barabbas) — Θ ƒ^{1} 700* syr^{s, pal} arm geo^{2}
τὸν Βαραββᾶν (the Barabbas) — B 1010 Origen Jerome ("Barabbas, or Bar Rabbah, which is interpreted as the son of their master)
Βαραββᾶν (Barabbas) — א A D K L W Δ Π 064 f^{13} 565 700^{c} 892 1009 1071 1079 1195 1216 1230 1241 1242 1253 1344 1365 1546 1646 2148 2174 𝔐/Byz Lect cop^{sa,bo} goth

Matthew 27:17

Ἰησοῦν τὸν Βαραββᾶν (Jesus, the son of their rabban) (Θ) f^{1} 22* (700*) syr^{s,pal^{mss}} arm geo^{mss} Origen^{pt} and Origen^{mss}
τὸν Βαραββᾶν (the son of their rabban) B 1010 Origen^{pt}
Βαραββᾶν (Barabbas) א A D L W f^{13} 33 Byz latt syr^{p,h} co Origen^{mss}

Matthew 27:21

τὸν Βαραββᾶν (the son of their rabban) א B L Θ f^{1} 33 892*
Βαραββᾶν (Barabbas) A D W f^{13} Byz

Matthew 27:24

κατέναντι (in the sight of) B D 0281
ἀπέναντι (amidst) א A L W Θ f^{1} f^{13} 33 Byz

Matthew 27:28

εκδυσαντες αυτον (upon undressing him) — א Α K L W Δ Θ Π 0250 'f^{1} 'f^{13} 565 700 892 1009 1010 1071 1079 1216 1230 1241 1242 1253 1344 1365 1546 1646 2148 2174 Byz Lect aur ff^{1} g1 l vg syr cop arm geo
ενδυσαντες αυτον (upon clothing him) — א^{1} B D 157 1424 it^{mss} vg^{mss} syr^{s} eth Origen Diatessaron
εκδυσαντες αυτον τα ιματια αυτου — 064 33 1195
ενδυσαντες αυτον ιματιον πορφυρουν και — D it

Matthew 27:41

τῶν γραμματέων καὶ Φαρισαίων (the scribes and Pharisees) D W 517 1424 it^{a,b,c,d,ff^{2},g^{1},h,q,r^{1}} syr^{s}
τῶν γραμματέων καὶ πρεσβυτέρων (the scribes and elders) א A B L Θ f^{1} f^{13} 33 652 700 892 it^{aur,ff^{1},g^{1},l} vg co^{sa^{mss}},bo^{mss} mae-1 Codex Schøyen
τῶν γραμματέων καὶ πρεσβυτέρων καὶ Φαρισαίων (the scribes and elders and Pharisees) Y Δ Π Σ Φ 22 157 565 Byz it^{f} syr^{p,h} co^{bo^{mss}}
omit text — Γ

Matthew 27:46

λαμὰ ζαφθανι {"lamah zaphthani"} (Why have you forsaken me?) D* it^{mss}
λαμα σαβαχθανί {"lama sabachthani"} (Why have you forsaken me?) Θ f^{1} vg^{mss} mae-1
λιμὰ σαβαχθανί {"lima sabachthani"} (Why have you forsaken me?) A (W) f^{13} Byz it^{mss}
λεμα σαβακτανεί {"lema sabaktanei"} (Why have you forsaken me?) B (892) it^{mss} vg^{mss} co^{bo^{mss}}
λεμα σαβαχθανι {"lema sabachthani"} (Why have you forsaken me?) א L 33 700 it^{ms}

Matthew 27:49 (see John 19:34)

Ηλιας σωσων αυτον αλλος δε λαβων λογχην ενυξεν αυτου την πλευραν και εξηλθεν υδωρ και αιμα (Elijah will save him. Then another, upon taking a spear, pierced his side, and out came water and blood.) — א B C (L) U 5 26 175 871 1010 1011 1057 1293 1300 1416 1566 1701 2126 2585 2622 2766* vg^{mss} syr^{pal^{mss}} cop^{mae-1} eth^{ms} slav Chrysostom^{per Severus} Cyril^{per Severus}
Ηλιας σωσων αυτον αλλος δε λαβων λογχην ενυξεν αυτου την πλευραν και εξηλθεν αιμα και υδωρ (Elijah will save him. Then another, upon taking a spear, pierced his side, and out came blood and water.) — U (Γ) 48 67 115 127 160 364 782 1392 1448 1555 1780 2117 2139 2283 2328 2437* 2586 2680 2787 vg^{ms} Codex Schøyen arab^{ms}
Ηλιας σωσων αυτον (Elijah will save him.) — A D E F G H K M S W Y Δ Θ Π Σ Ω 090 f^{1} f^{13} 1 2 22 28 33 35 69 118 124 157 180 205 346 372 565 579 597 700 788 892 1005 1006 1009 1071 1079 1195 1216 1230 1241 1242 1243 1253 1292 1342 1344 1365 1424 1505 1546 1582 1646 2148 2174 2358 2372 2737 𝔐 Lect lat syr^{s,p,h,pal^{mss}} cop^{sa,bo} goth arm eth^{mss} geo Diatessaron Origen Eusebius Apostolic Canons Hilary Jerome Augustine Hesychius

Matthew 27:56

Ἰωσὴφ (of Joseph) – Westcott and Hort 1881, Westcott and Hort / [NA27 and UBS4 variants], Tischendorf's 8th Edition 1864–94, Nestle 1904
Ἰωσῆ (of Joses) – Stephanus Textus Receptus 1550, Scrivener's Textus Receptus 1894, RP Byzantine Majority Text 2005, Greek Orthodox Church

Matthew 27:65

Ἔχετε φυλακὰς (You have watchmen) D* it^{mss} vg^{ms} co^{bo} mae-1
Ἔχετε κουστωδίαν (You have a watch) rell

Matthew 27:66

τῶν φυλακων (their watchmen) D* it^{mss} vg^{mss} co^{bo^{mss}} mae-1
τῆς κουστωδίας (their watch) rell

6 Textual variants in Matthew 28

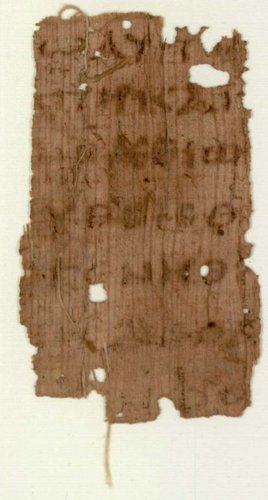
Matthew 28:2-5 from Papyrus 105 (verso)

Matthew 28:2

ἀπεκύλισεν τὸν λίθον (rolled away the stone) א B D 700 892 it^{mss} vg syr^{s} co^{sa}
ἀπεκύλισεν τὸν λίθον ἀπὸ τῆς θύρας (rolled away the stone from the opening) A C K W Δ 579 1424 Byz^{mss} it^{mss} syr^{p}
ἀπεκύλισεν τὸν λίθον ἀπὸ τῆς θύρας τοῦ μνημείου (rolled away the stone from the opening of the tomb) L Γ Θ f^{1} f^{13} 22 33 157 565 1241 Byz^{mss} syr^{h,pal} co^{bo} mae-1 Codex Schøyen Eusebius

Matthew 28:6

τὸν τόπον ὅπου ἔκειτο ὁ κύριος (the place where the Lord was positioned) A C D L W Δ 0148 f^{1} f^{13} 652 Byz it^{mss} vg syr^{(p),h,pal}
τὸν τόπον ὅπου ἔκειτο (the place where he was positioned) א B Θ 33 892* it^{e} syr^{s} co Codex Schøyen
τὸν τόπον ὅπου ἔκειτο τὸ σῶμα τοῦ κυρίου (the place where was positioned the body of the Lord) 1424
τὸν τόπον ὅπου ἔκειτο ὁ Ἰησοῦς (the place where Jesus was positioned) Φ

Matthew 28:7

omits text ἀπὸ τῶν νεκρῶν (from the dead) with 565 it^{a,b,d,e,ff^{1},g^{1},h,l,r^{1}} vg syr^{s} arm Origen

Matthew 28:9

Ὡς δὲ ἐπορεύοντο ἀπαγγεῖλαι τοῖς μαθηταῖς αὐτοῦ (But as they were going to address his disciples) opens verse in A C L Δ Σ Φ 0148 f^{1} (1424) Byz it^{f,(q)} syr^{h}
text omitted — א B D W Θ f^{13} 13 33 69 279 700 788 892 1292 2680 it^{mss} vg syr^{p} co Codex Schøyen Origen Eusebius Cyril

Matthew 28:18

ἐν οὐρανοῖς (in the heavens) D
ἐν οὐρανῷ (in heaven) rell

Matthew 28:19

Πορευθέντες οὖν (omit οὖν in א A ƒ^{13} 𝔐/Byz) μαθητεύσατε πάντα τὰ ἔθνη βαπτίζοντες (—σαντες in B D) αὐτοὺς εἰς τὸ ὄνομα τοῦ πατρὸς καὶ τοῦ υἱοῦ καὶ τοῦ ἁγίου πνεύματος (Go therefore, make disciples of all the nations, baptizing them into the name of the father and of the son and of the holy spirit) א A B D W ƒ^{1,13} 𝔐/Byz latt syr co rell
Πορευθέντες μαθητεύσατε πάντα τὰ ἔθνη ἐν τῷ ὀνόματί μου (Go make disciples of all the nations in my name) Eusebius^{Ante-Nicene}

Compare with Acts 2:38, Acts 10:48, Acts 19:5, Romans 6:3, 1 Corinthians 1:13

== See also ==
- Textual variants in the New Testament
  - Textual variants in the Gospel of Mark
  - Textual variants in the Gospel of Luke
  - Textual variants in the Gospel of John
- Differences between codices Sinaiticus and Vaticanus
- Textual criticism
