= Leningrad Codex =

11th-century Hebrew Bible manuscript

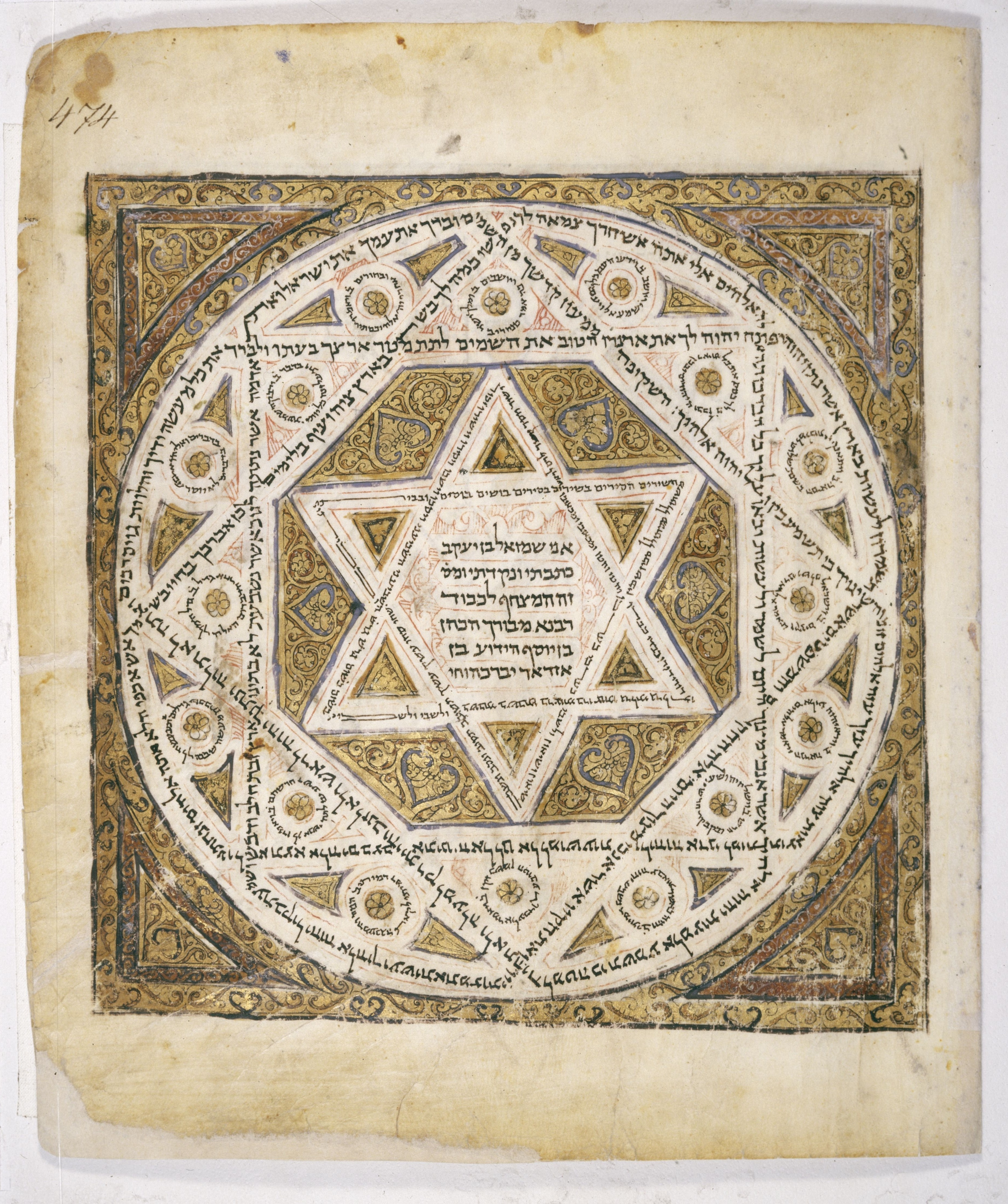
Leningrad Codex (cover page E, folio 474a)

The Leningrad Codex (Latin: Codex Leningradensis [Leningrad Book]; Hebrew: כתב יד לנינגרד) is the oldest known complete manuscript of the Hebrew Bible in Hebrew, using the Masoretic Text and Tiberian vocalization. According to its colophon, it was made in Cairo in AD 1008 (or possibly 1009).

Some have proposed that the Leningrad Codex was corrected against the Aleppo Codex, a slightly earlier manuscript that was partially lost in the 20th century. However, Paul E. Kahle argues that the Leningrad manuscript was more likely based on other, lost manuscripts by the ben Asher family. The Aleppo Codex is several decades older, but parts of it have been missing since the 1947 anti-Jewish riots in Aleppo, making the Leningrad Codex the oldest complete codex of the Tiberian mesorah that has survived intact to this day.

In modern times, the Leningrad Codex is significant as the Hebrew text reproduced in Biblia Hebraica (1937), Biblia Hebraica Stuttgartensia (1977), and Biblia Hebraica Quinta (2004–present). It also serves as a primary source for the recovery of details in the missing parts of the Aleppo Codex.

== Name ==
The Leningrad Codex (a codex is a handwritten book bound at one side, as opposed to a scroll) is so named because it has been housed at the National Library of Russia in Saint Petersburg since 1863 (before 1917 named Imperial Public Library). In 1924, after the Russian Revolution, Petrograd (formerly Saint Petersburg) was renamed Leningrad, and, because the codex was used as the basic text for the Biblia Hebraica since 1937, it became internationally known as the "Leningrad Codex". Although the city's name was restored to the original St Petersburg after the dissolution of the Soviet Union in 1991, the National Library of Russia requested that "Leningrad" be retained in the name of the codex. Nonetheless, the Codex is occasionally referred to as the Codex Petropolitanus, Petrograd Codex, Codex Petersburgensis, or St. Petersburg Codex. This is ambiguous as, since 1876, these appellations refer to a different biblical codex (MS. Heb B 3) which is even older (AD 916), but contains only the Latter Prophets.

== Contents ==
The biblical text as found in the codex contains the Hebrew letter-text along with Tiberian vowels and cantillation signs. In addition, there are masoretic notes in the margins. There are also various technical supplements dealing with textual and linguistic details, many of which are painted in geometrical forms. The codex is written on parchment and bound in leather.

The Leningrad Codex, in extraordinarily pristine condition after a millennium, also provides an example of medieval Jewish art. Sixteen of the pages contain decorative geometric patterns that illuminate passages from the text. The carpet page shows a star with the names of the scribes on the edges and a blessing written in the middle.

The order of the books in the Leningrad Codex follows the Tiberian textual tradition, which is also that of the later tradition of Sephardic biblical manuscripts. This order for the books differs markedly from that of most printed Hebrew bibles for the books of the Ketuvim. In the Leningrad Codex, the order of the Ketuvim is: Chronicles, Psalms, Job, Proverbs, Ruth, Song of Songs, Ecclesiastes, Lamentations, Esther, Daniel, Ezra-Nehemiah. The full order of the books is given below.

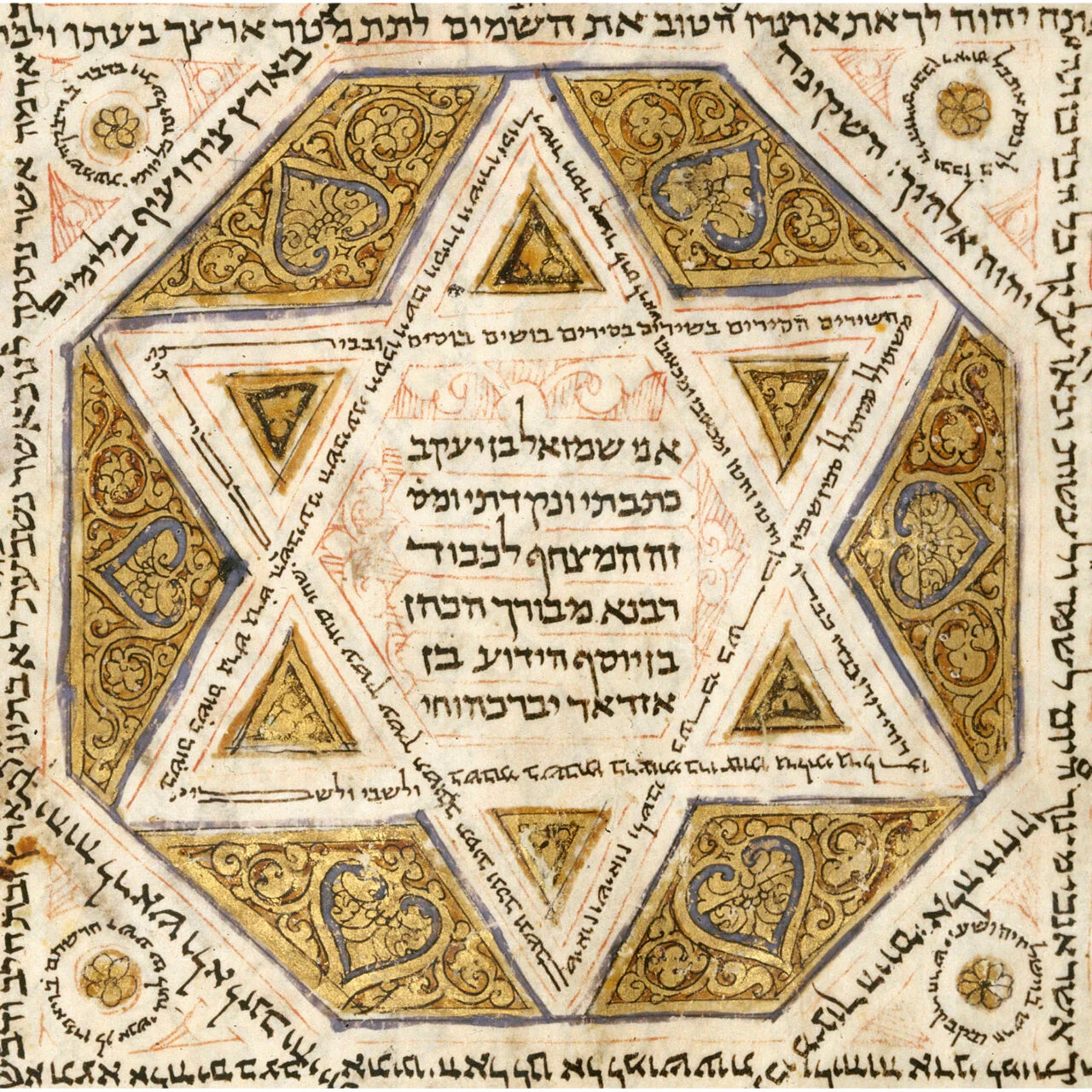
Leningrad Codex Carpet Page

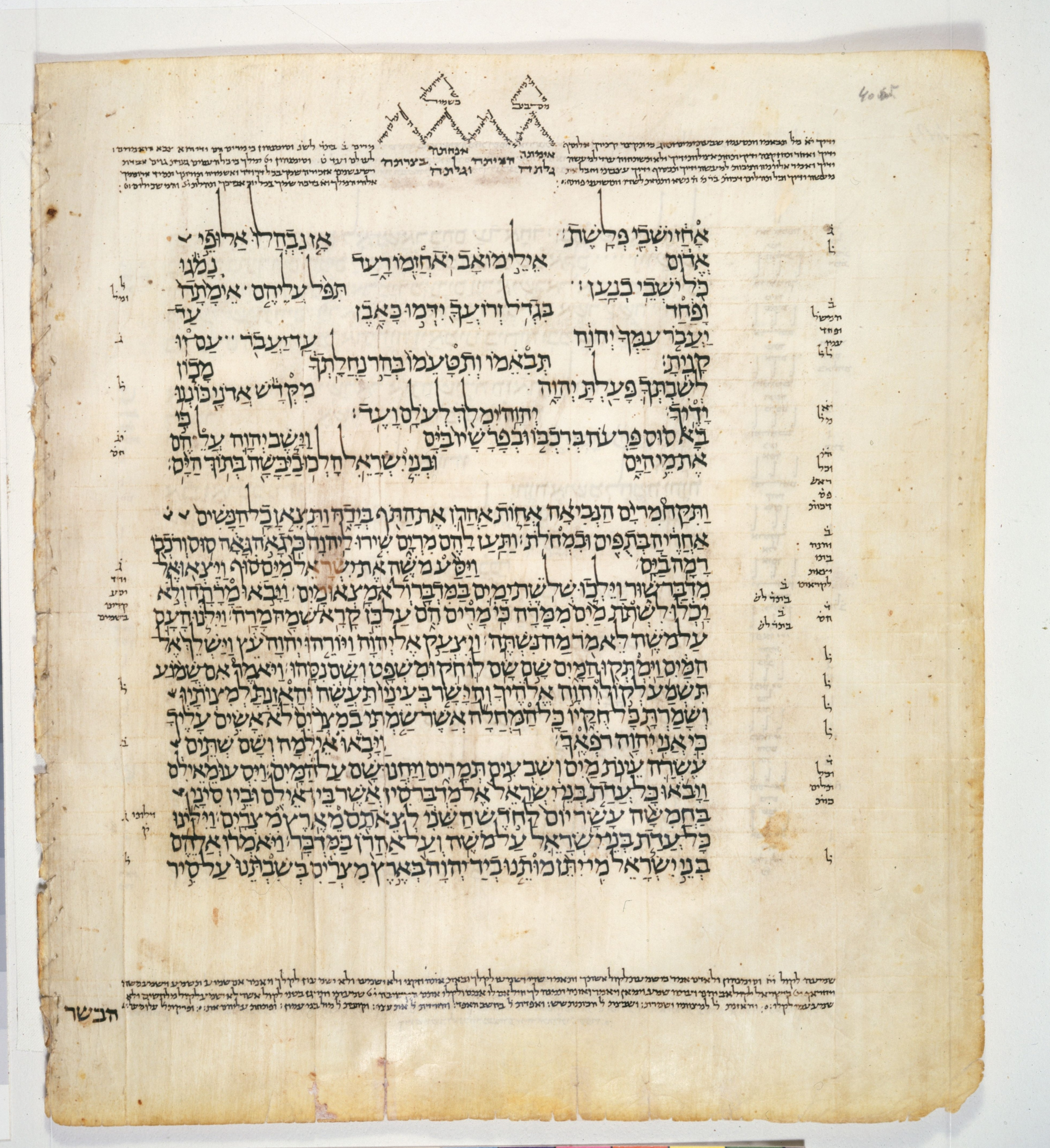
Leningrad Codex folio 40 verso, Exodus 15:14b-16:3a

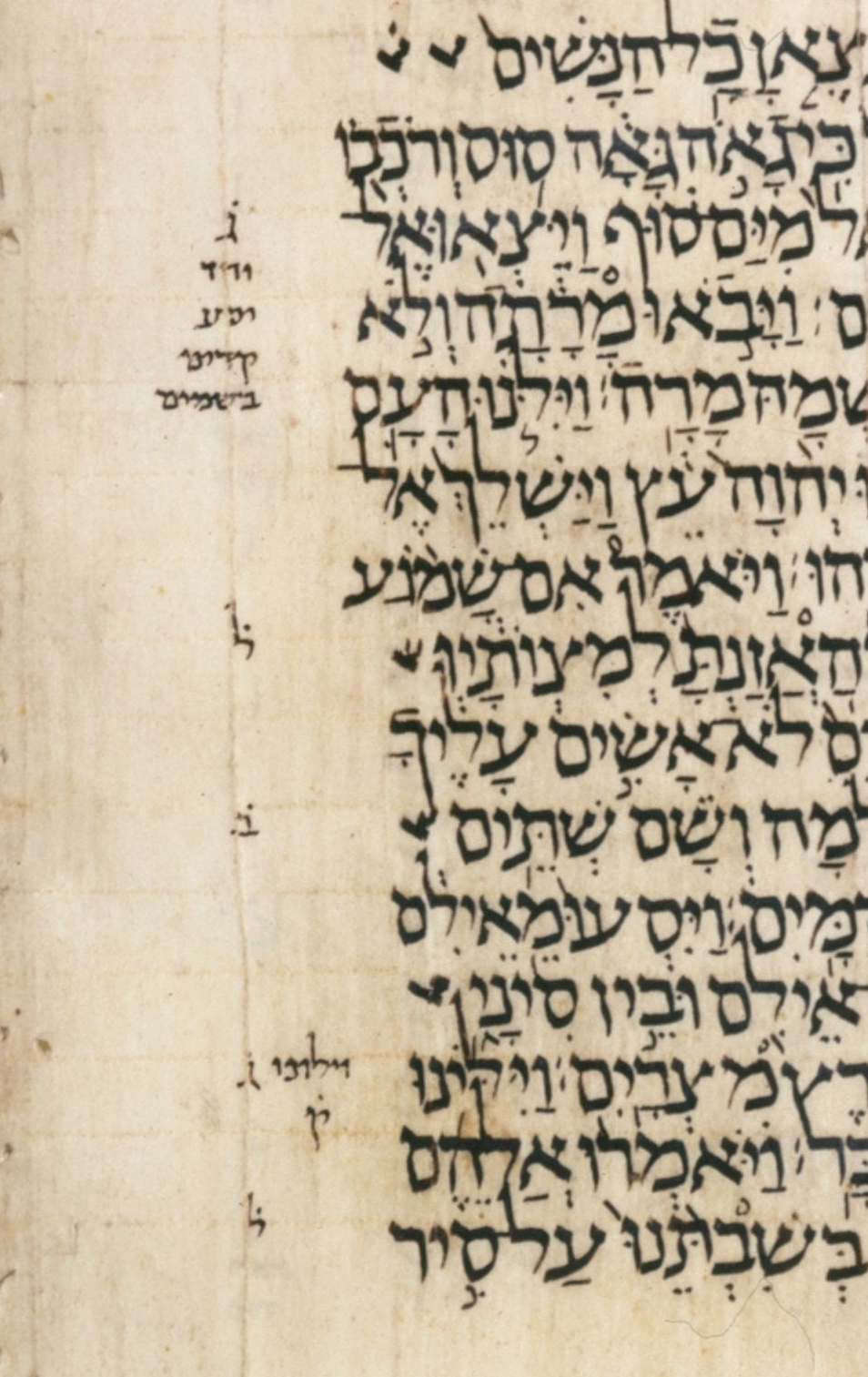
Leningrad Codex text sample, portions of Exodus 15:21–16:3

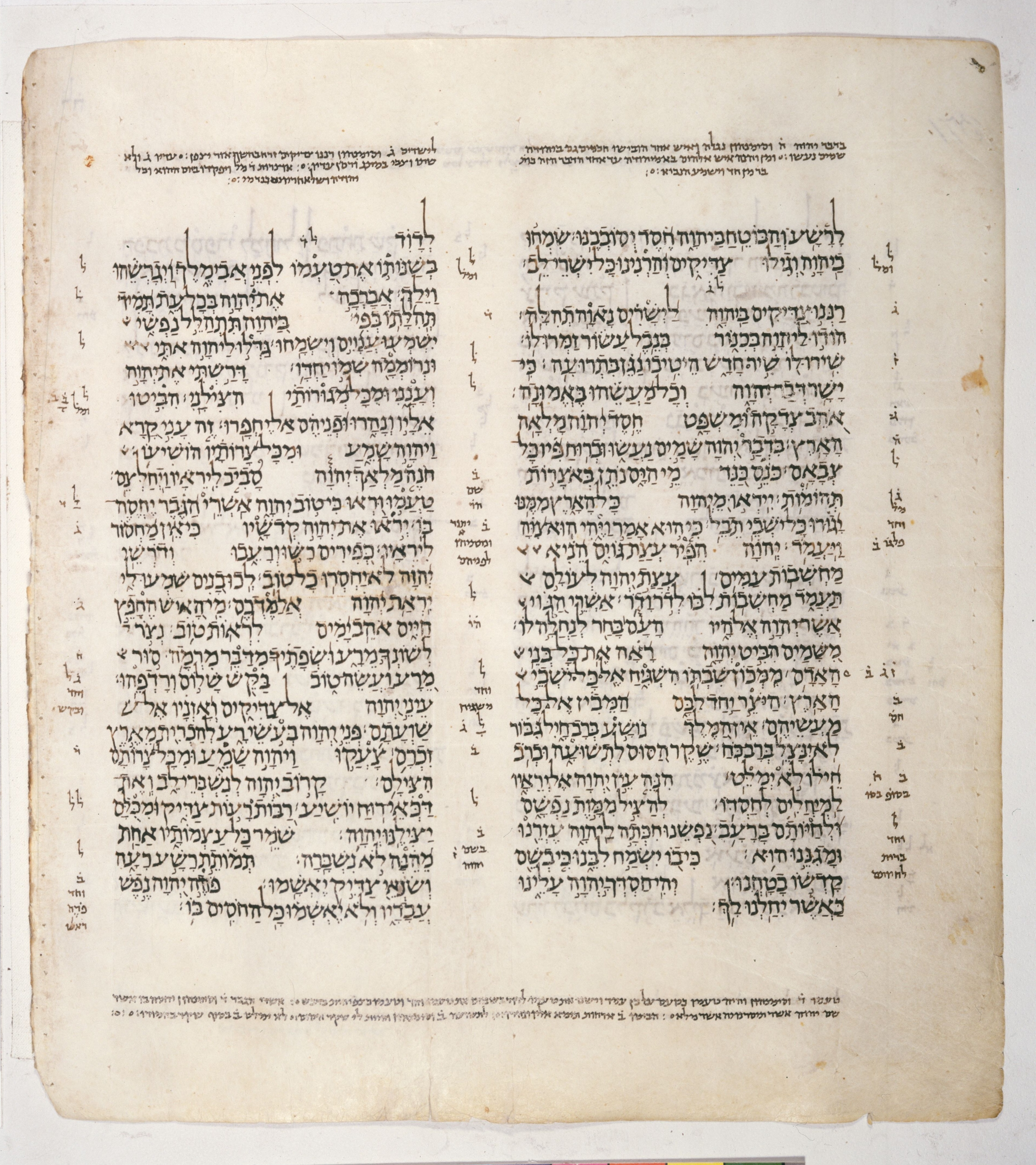
Page from the Leningrad Codex

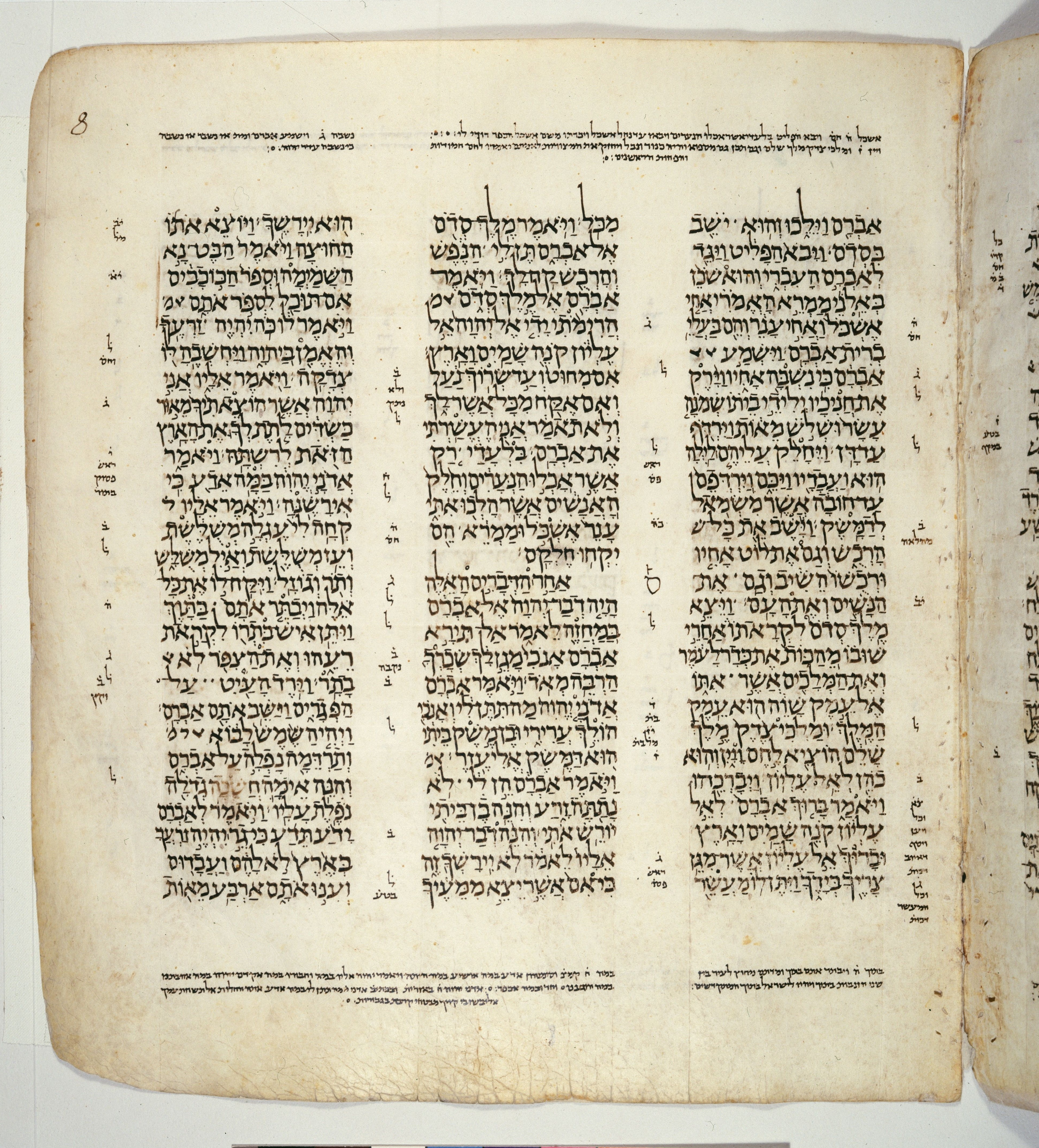
Page from the Leningrad Codex

== History ==
According to its colophon, the codex was copied in Cairo from manuscripts written by Aaron ben Moses ben Asher. It has been claimed to be a product of the ben Asher scriptorium itself; however, there is no evidence that ben Asher ever saw it. Unusually for a masoretic codex, the same man (Samuel ben Jacob) wrote the consonants, the vowels and the Masoretic notes. In its vocalization system (vowel points and cantillation) it is considered by scholars to be the most faithful representative of ben Asher's tradition apart from the Aleppo Codex (edited by ben Asher himself). Its letter-text is not perfect, however, and contradicts its own masoretic apparatus in hundreds of places. (Note: On the vocalization and letter-text of the Leningrad Codex see Yeivin, Israel (1968). The Aleppo Codex of the Bible: A Study of its Vocalization and Accentuation. Text in Hebrew, foreword and summary in English. Jerusalem: Magnes Press, Hebrew University. pp. 357–359.) There are numerous alterations and erasures, and it was suggested by Moshe Goshen-Gottstein that an existing text not following ben Asher's rules was heavily amended so as to make it conform to these rules.

According to several colophons, the patron and likely first owner of manuscript was Mevorach ben Yosef ha-Kohen, about whom no further information is known. On folio 1 recto, a note records that the manuscript was sold in 1134 in Fustat to Mazliach ha-Kohen, who was the head of the yeshiva Geon Yaakov.

The codex is now preserved in the National Library of Russia, accessioned as "Firkovich B 19 A". Its former owner, the Crimean Karaite collector Abraham Firkovich, left no indication in his writings where he had acquired the codex, which was taken to Odessa, in the Russian Empire, in 1838 and later transferred to the Imperial Library in St Petersburg.

== Modern editions ==
=== Biblia Hebraica ===
In 1935, the Leningrad Codex was lent to the Old Testament Seminar of the University of Leipzig for two years while Paul E. Kahle supervised its transcription for the Hebrew text of the third edition of Biblia Hebraica (BHK), published in Stuttgart, 1937. The codex was also used for Biblia Hebraica Stuttgartensia (BHS) in 1977, and is being used for Biblia Hebraica Quinta (BHQ).

As an original work by Tiberian masoretes, the Leningrad Codex was older by several centuries than the other Hebrew manuscripts which had been used for all previous editions of printed Hebrew bibles until Biblia Hebraica.

The Westminster Leningrad Codex is a digital version of the Leningrad Codex maintained by the J. Alan Groves Center for Advanced Biblical Research located at the Westminster Theological Seminary in Glenside, Pennsylvania. This is a verified version of the Michigan-Claremont text, transcribed from BHS at the University of Michigan in 1981–1982 under the direction of H. Van Dyke Parunak (of the University of Michigan) and Richard E. Whitaker (of the Institute for Antiquity and Christianity, Claremont Graduate University) with funding from the Packard Foundation and the University of Michigan, with further proofreading and corrections. The version includes transcription notes and tools for analyzing syntax.

=== Jewish editions ===
The Leningrad Codex also served as the basis for two modern Jewish editions of the Hebrew Bible (Tanakh):

- The Dotan edition, Biblia Hebraica Leningradensia (a version of which was distributed to soldiers in mass quantities as the official Tanakh of the Israel Defense Forces throughout the 1990s).
- The JPS Hebrew-English Tanakh (Philadelphia, 1999) and the various volumes of the JPS Torah Commentary and JPS Bible Commentary use the Westminster text described above.

It was also used as the basis for Etz Hayim, the humash of the Conservative movement.

(Contrary to popular belief as previously stated on this page, the Koren editions of Tanakh are not based primarily on the Leningrad Codex, but on the second edition Mikraot Gedolot published by Daniel Bomberg in Venice in 1525, with changes made to the text based on a variety of older manuscripts which are not named by the publisher. It is possible, as some have claimed, that the Leningrad Codex was among those used, but it is not specifically named by the publisher.)

For minute masoretic details, however, Israeli and Jewish scholars have shown a marked preference for modern Hebrew editions based upon the Aleppo Codex. These editions use the Leningrad Codex as the most important source (but not the only one) for the reconstruction of parts of the Aleppo Codex that have been missing since 1947.

== Sequence of the books ==
As explained in the Contents section above, the order of the books in the Leningrad Codex follows the Tiberian textual tradition and is different from most modern Hebrew bibles:

The Torah:

1. Genesis [בראשית / Bereishit]
2. Exodus [שמות / Shemot]
3. Leviticus [ויקרא / Vayikra]
4. Numbers [במדבר / Bamidbar]
5. Deuteronomy [דברים / Devarim]

The Nevi'im:

6. Joshua [יהושע / Yehoshua]
7. Judges [שופטים / Shofetim]
8. Samuel (I & II) [שמואל / Shemuel]
9. Kings (I & II) [מלכים / Melakhim]
10. Isaiah [ישעיהו / Yeshayahu]
11. Jeremiah [ירמיהו / Yirmiyahu]
12. Ezekiel [יחזקאל / Yehezqel]
13. The Twelve Prophets [תרי עשר]

a. Hosea [הושע / Hoshea]
b. Joel [יואל / Yo'el]
c. Amos [עמוס / Amos]
d. Obadiah [עובדיה / Ovadyah]
e. Jonah [יונה / Yonah]
f. Micah [מיכה / Mikhah]
g. Nahum [נחום / Nachum]
h. Habakkuk חבקוק / Habakuk]
i. Zephaniah [צפניה / Tsefanyah]
j. Haggai [חגי / Hagai]
k. Zechariah [זכריה / Zekharyah]
l. Malachi [מלאכי / Mal'akhi]

The Ketuvim

14. Chronicles (I & II) [דברי הימים / Divrei Hayamim]

The "Sifrei Emet," "Books of Truth":
15. Psalms [תהלים / Tehilim]
16. Job [איוב / Iyov]
17. Proverbs [משלי / Mishlei]

The "Five Megilot" or "Five Scrolls":
18. Ruth [רות / Rut]
19. Song of Songs [שיר השירים / Shir Hashirim]
20. Ecclesiastes [קהלת / Kohelet]
21. Lamentations [איכה / Eikhah]
22. Esther [אסתר / Esther]

The rest of the "Writings":
23. Daniel [דניאל / Dani'el]
24. Ezra–Nehemiah [עזרא ונחמיה / Ezra ve-Nehemiah]

== See also ==
- Tanakh at Qumran
- List of Hebrew Bible manuscripts
  - Aleppo Codex
  - Codex Sassoon
  - Codex Cairensis
  - Codex Orientales
  - Damascus Pentateuch
  - Codex Vaticanus
