= Papyrus 19 =

Papyrus 𝔓^{19}
- New Testament manuscript
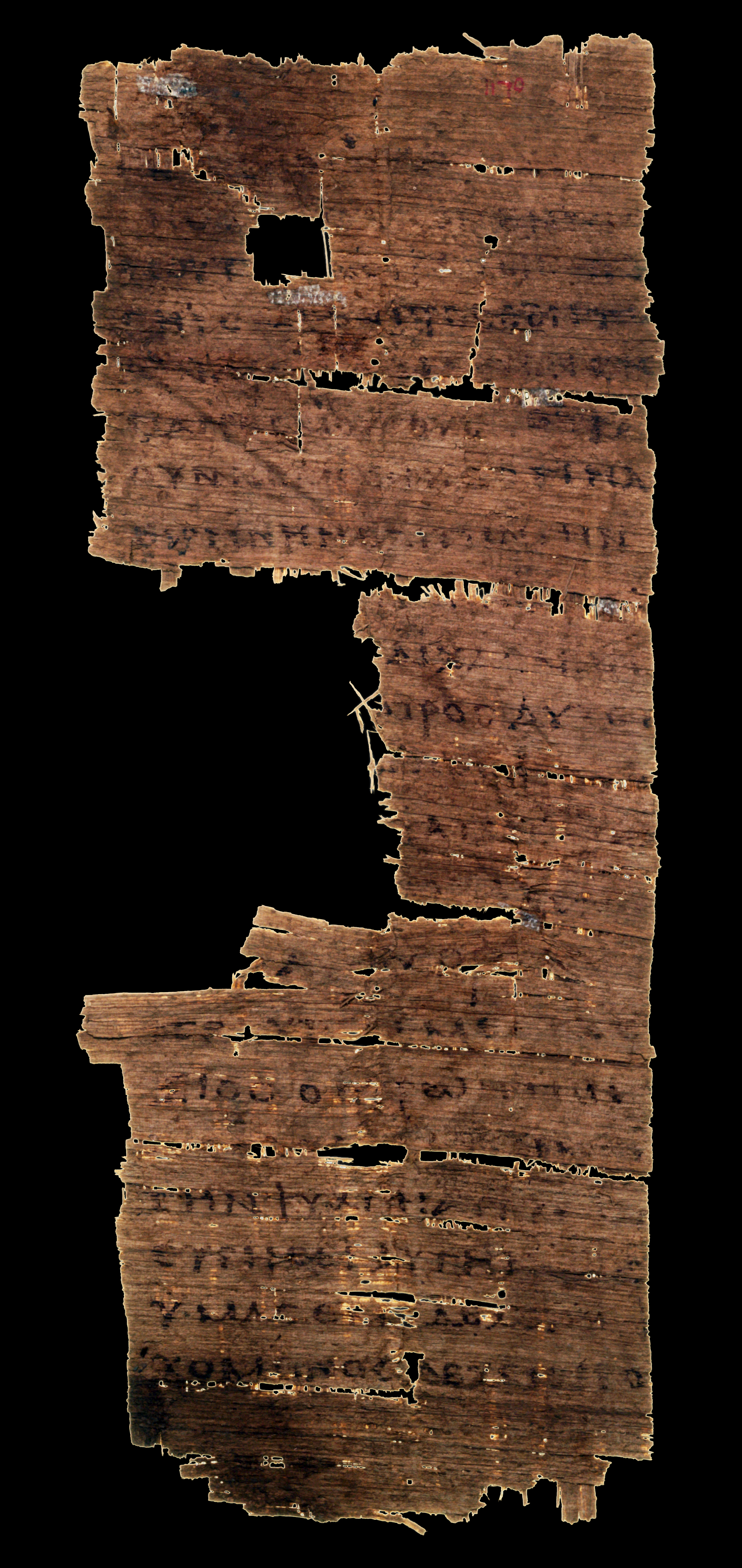
- Recto Matthew 10:32–11:5
- Name: Oxyrhynchus Papyri 1170
- Text: Gospel of Matthew 10-11 †
- Date: 4th/5th century
- Script: Greek
- Found: Egypt
- Now at: Bodleian Library
- Cite: B. P. Grenfell & A. S. Hunt, Oxyrhynchus Papyri IX, (London 1912), pp. 4-8
- Size: 9 x 9 cm
- Type: Alexandrian text-type
- Category: II
- Hand: upright uncial

Papyrus 19 (in the Gregory-Aland numbering), signed by 𝔓^{19}, is an early copy of the New Testament in Greek. The manuscript paleographically has been assigned to the 4th or 5th century.

The papyrus is currently housed at the Bodleian Library, Gr. bibl. d. 6 (P) at the University of Oxford.

== Description ==
Papyrus 19 is a papyrus manuscript of the Gospel of Matthew, containing text for Matthew 10:32-11:5. The leaf is complete at the top and bottom, but broken at the sides.

The Greek text of this codex is a representative of the Alexandrian text-type. Aland placed it in Category II.

== Text ==
Matthew 10:32–40

^{[32]} – ε̣ν̣π̣[ροσ]θ̣ε̣ν̣ τ̣ω̣ν̣ [ανθρωπων ομολογ]η̣σ̣ω̣ [καγ]ω̣ α̣υ̣τ̣ον ενπ̣ρ̣ο̣[σθεν του πατρος] μου τ[ου ε]ν̣ ου̣ρ̣α̣ν̣οις. ^{[33]} ο̣σ̣[τις δ αν αρνη]σητ̣ε με εν̣προσθεν τω̣[ν ανθρωπων] α̣ρ̣νη̣σ̣[ομε] κ̣αγ̣ω α̣υ̣τ̣ο̣ν ε̣νπ̣[ροσθεν του] πατρο̣ς μου τ̣ου εν̣ ου̣ρα[νοις] ^{[34]} [μη] ουν νομισητ̣ε̣ οτι ηλ[θον βαλειν] ειρηνην επι την γ̣ην [ουκ ηλθον βαλειν ειρηνην αλλα μαχαιραν] ^{[35]} [ηλθον γαρ] διχασα̣ι αν̣θ̣[ρωπον κατα του π]α̣τρος αυτ̣ο̣υ̣ [και θυγατερα κ]α̣τ̣α̣ τ̣[ης μητρος αυτης και νυμφην κα]τ̣α τη̣ς̣ [πενθερας αυτης] ^{[36]} [και εχθροι] τ̣ο̣[υ] αν̣θ̣ρ̣ω̣[που οι οικιακοι] α[υτ]ο̣υ ^{[37]} ο φι̣λ̣[ων πατερα η μη]τ̣ερα̣ υπε̣ρ̣ εμε ο̣υ̣κ̣ ε̣[στιν μου] [α]ξιος ^{[39]} ο ευρων̣ την [ψυχην αυτου] α̣[πο]λ̣ε̣σ̣[ει] α̣υ̣τ̣ην̣ κ̣α̣[ι ο απολεσας] την ψυχην αυ̣το̣υ̣ ε̣ν̣[εκεν εμου] ευρησει αυτην̣ ^{[40]} [ο δ]ε̣χ̣[ομενος] υμας εμε̣ δεχετ[α]ι̣ [και ο εμε δε]χομε̣νος δεχετ̣α̣ι̣ τ̣ο[ν αποστει]

Matthew 10:41–11:5

[λαντα με] ^{[41]} [ο δ]ε̣χομε̣νο̣ς̣ προ̣φ̣ητ̣η̣ν̣ [εις ονομ]α̣ π̣ρ̣οφητ̣ο̣υ [μισθο]ν̣ π̣ρο[φητου λη]μψ̣ε̣τ̣α̣ι̣ κ̣α̣ι̣ ο̣ δ̣[εχο]μ̣ε̣ν̣ο̣ς̣ [δικαιον ε]ι̣ς ονομα δ̣ι̣κ̣αιου̣ μισθ̣ο̣ν̣ [δικαιου λ]η̣ψ̣ετα̣ι ^{[42]} κ̣α̣ι̣ ο̣ς̣ ε̣α̣ν̣ π̣ο̣[τιση εν]α̣ των μικ̣ρ̣ων τ̣ου̣τ̣ω̣ν̣ [ποτηριο]ν̣ ψ̣υχρο̣υ̣ μ̣ον̣ο̣ν̣ εις ο[νομα μ]α̣θητο̣υ̣ α̣μ̣η̣ν̣ [λ]ε̣γω υμιν̣ [ου μη] [α]π̣ο̣[λεσ]η̣ [τον μισθον αυτου] ^{[1]} [κα]ι̣ ε[γενετο οτε ετελεσεν ο ιησους δι]α̣τ[ασ]σ̣ω̣ν̣ τ̣ο̣[ις δωδεκα μαθηταις] α̣υ̣[το]υ̣ [με]τ̣[εβη εκειθεν του διδα]σκ̣[ειν] κ̣α̣ι̣ [κηρυσσειν εν ταις] π̣ο̣[λεσιν αυτων] ^{[2]} [ο δε ιωαννης α]κο̣[υσας εν τω δεσμωτηριω] – ^{[3]} – [αυτω συ ει] ο ε̣ρ̣χ̣ο̣μ̣ε̣ν̣[ος η ετερον προσδο]κ̣ω̣μ̣ε̣[ν] ^{[4]} [και αποκριθεις ο ιησους ει]π̣εν αυτ̣ο̣ι̣[ς πο]ρ̣ε̣υ̣θ̣εν̣[τ]ε̣[ς απαγγει]λατε ι̣ω̣α̣ν̣[νη] α̣ ακ̣ο̣υ̣[ετε και β]λ̣ε̣π̣ε̣τ̣[ε] ^{[5]} τ̣υ̣φ̣[λο]ι̣ α̣ν̣α̣[βλεπουσιν και] χωλ̣ο̣ι̣ πε̣ρ̣ι̣π̣α̣[τουσιν] –

== Notable Readings ==
Matthew 10:34 has the variant ουν νομίσητε (Therefore, you^{pl} think) instead of μη νομίσητε (Do not think).

Matthew 10:37b (and the person loving their son or daughter more than me is not worthy of me) is omitted, as in B* D 983 syr^{h} Codex Schøyen

Matthew 10:38 is omitted, as in M*

Matthew 10:37b–38 is also omitted in the Hebrew Shem Tov Matthew manuscript.

== See also ==
- List of New Testament papyri
