= Matthew 11:12 =

- ← 11:11 11:13 →
- Book: Gospel of Matthew
- Christian Bible part: New Testament

Matthew 11:12 is the twelfth verse in the eleventh chapter of the Gospel of Matthew in the New Testament.

== Content ==
In the original Greek according to Westcott-Hort for this verse is:

Ἀπὸ δὲ τῶν ἡμερῶν Ἰωάννου τοῦ βαπτιστοῦ ἕως ἄρτι ἡ βασιλεία τῶν οὐρανῶν βιάζεται, καὶ βιασταὶ ἁρπάζουσιν αὐτήν.

In the King James Version of the Bible the text reads:

And from the days of John the Baptist until now the kingdom of heaven suffereth violence, and the violent take it by force.

The New International Version translates the passage as:

From the days of John the Baptist until now, the kingdom of heaven has been subjected to violence, and violent men have been raiding it.

== Analysis ==
This verse (and the next one) parallels Luke 16:16. Lapide gives three possible interpretations for this verse. 1) Because many, being stirred up by John's preaching run to obtain it with zeal. 2) The kingdom is invaded, in such sort that sinners, publicans, harlots, Gentiles, "by the fervour of their repentance, seize it by force, away from the Pharisees and Jews, who thought that it belonged to them alone." 3) Worldly people do violence to themselves through their repentance, poverty, continence, mortification to obtain it.

There appears to be some allusion to the way Canaan was taken by force to become a Jewish nation in this passage.

== Commentary from the Church Fathers ==
Glossa Ordinaria: "That what He had last said should not lead any to suppose that John was an alien from the kingdom of heaven, He corrects this by adding, From the days of John the Baptist until now, the kingdom of heaven suffereth violence, and the violent take it by force."

Gregory the Great: "By the kingdom of heaven is meant the heavenly throne, whither when sinners defiled with any evil deed return in penitence, and amend themselves, they enter as sinners into the place of another, and take by violence the kingdom of heaven."

Jerome: " Because John the Baptist was the first who preached repentance to the people, saying, Repent ye, for the kingdom of heaven is at hand: rightly therefore from that day forth it may be said, that the kingdom of heaven suffereth violence, and the violent take it by force. For great indeed is the violence, when we who are born of earth, seek an abode in heaven, and obtain by excellence what we have not by nature."

Hilary of Poitiers: " Otherwise; The Lord bade His Apostles go to the lost sheep of Israel, but all their preaching conveyed profit to the publicans and sinners. Therefore the kingdom suffers violence, and the violent take it by force, for the glory of Israel, due to the Fathers, foretold by the Prophets, offered by Christ, is entered and held by force by the might of the Gentiles."

Chrysostom: " Or; All who come thereto with haste take by force the kingdom of God through the faith of Christ; whence He says, from, the days of John until now, and thus He brings them in haste to His faith, and at the same time adds support to those things which had been spoken by John. For if all things were fulfilled until John, then is Jesus He that should come; wherefore He adds, All the Prophets and the Law prophesied until John."

Preceded by Matthew 11:11	Gospel of Matthew; Chapter 11	Succeeded by Matthew 11:13
