= Matthew 11:11 =

- ← 11:10 11:12 →
- Book: Gospel of Matthew
- Christian Bible part: New Testament

Matthew 11:11 is the eleventh verse in the eleventh chapter of the Gospel of Matthew in the New Testament.

== Content ==
In the original Greek according to Westcott-Hort for this verse is:

Ἀμὴν λέγω ὑμῖν, οὐκ ἐγήγερται ἐν γεννητοῖς γυναικῶν μείζων Ἰωάννου τοῦ βαπτιστοῦ· ὁ δὲ μικρότερος ἐν τῇ βασιλείᾳ τῶν οὐρανῶν μείζων αὐτοῦ ἐστιν.

In the King James Version of the Bible the text reads:

Verily I say unto you, Among them that are born of women there hath not risen a greater than John the Baptist: notwithstanding he that is least in the kingdom of heaven is greater than he.

The New International Version translates the passage as:

I tell you the truth: Among those born of women there has not risen anyone greater than John the Baptist; yet he who is least in the kingdom of heaven is greater than he.

== Analysis ==
Luke 7:27 adds the word Prophet: "There has not arisen a greater prophet..." which is thought to have the same sense as here. However, this appears to be contradicted by Deut. 34:11 “And there arose not a prophet since in Israel like unto Moses.” However, the rest of the verse qualifies what is said, “Whom the Lord knew face to face, in all the signs and the wonders which the Lord sent him to do in the land of Egypt.” Lapide gives a number of reasons why John was so highly esteemed by Christ: "a standing miracle in his conception, in the womb, in his birth, in his angelic life. He was conceived, by a miracle, of barren parents; by a miracle he recognized Christ in the womb; and saluted and adored him; by a miracle, when he was born he communicated universal gladness; by a miracle, at his circumcision he restored the use of speech to his dumb father; by a miracle, he went when a boy into the desert, and there lived like an angel all his life." He thus concludes, "And so John has the crowns of virginity, prophecy, and martyrdom, in addition to the crown of a doctor."

The final phrase, "But he that is least ..." is said to mean, more blessed and more perfect, more excellent and glorious than John, "who was still a mortal traveler." MacEvilly believes that Christ added these words to move his hearers to follow His course salvation.

== Commentary from the Church Fathers ==
Chrysostom: " Having first delivered the Prophet’s testimony in praise of John, He rested not there, but added His own decision respecting him, saying, Among them that are born of women there has not arisen a greater than John the Baptist."

Rabanus Maurus: " As much as to say; What need to recount one by one the praises of John the Baptist; I say verily unto you, Among them that are born of women, &c. He says women, not virgins. If the same word mulier, which denotes a married person, is any where in the Gospels applied to Mary, it should be known that the translator has there used ‘mulier’ for ‘femina;’ as in that, Woman, behold thy son! (John 19:26)"

Jerome: " He is then set before all those that are born in wedlock, and not before Him who was born of the Virgin and the Holy Spirit; yet these words, there has not arisen a greater than John the Baptist, do not imply that John is to be set above the Prophets and Patriarchs and all others, but only makes him equal to the rest; for it does not follow that because others are not greater than him, that therefore he is greater than others."

Pseudo-Chrysostom: " But seeing that righteousness has so great deepness that none can be perfect therein but God only, I suppose that all the saints tried by the keenness of the divine judgment, rank in a fixed order, some lower, some before other. Whence we understand that He that hath none greater than Himself, is greater than all."

Chrysostom: " That the abundance of this praise might not beget a wrong inclination in the Jews to set John above Christ, he corrects this, saying, He that is least in the kingdom of heaven is greater than he."

Augustine: "The heretic1 argues from this verse to prove, that since John did not belong to the kingdom of heaven, therefore much less did the other Prophets of that people, than whom John is greater. But these words of the Lord may be understood in two ways. Either the kingdom of heaven is something which we have not yet received, that, namely, of, which He speaks, Come, ye blessed of my Father, receive the kingdom, (Mat. 25:34) because they in it are Angels, therefore the least among them is greater than a righteous man who has a corruptible body. Or if we must understand the kingdom of heaven of the Church, whose children are all the righteous men from the beginning of the world until now, then the Lord speaks this of Himself, who was after John in the time of His birth, but greater in respect of His divine nature and supreme power. According then to the first interpretation it will be pointed, He who is least in the kingdom of heaven, is greater than he; according to the second, He who is less than he, is in the kingdom of heaven greater than he."

Chrysostom: " The kingdom of heaven, that is, in the spiritual world, and all relating thereto. But some say that Christ spoke this of the Apostles."

Jerome: " We understand it simply, that every saint who is already with the Lord is greater than he who yet stands in the battle; for it is one thing to have gained the crown of victory, another to be yet fighting in the field."

Preceded by Matthew 11:10	Gospel of Matthew; Chapter 11	Succeeded by Matthew 11:12
