= Matthew 11:10 =

- ← 11:9 11:11 →
- Book: Gospel of Matthew
- Christian Bible part: New Testament

Matthew 11:10 is the tenth verse in the eleventh chapter of the Gospel of Matthew in the New Testament.

== Content ==
In the original Greek according to Westcott-Hort for this verse is:

Οὗτος γάρ ἐστι περὶ οὗ γέγραπται, Ἰδού, ἐγὼ ἀποστέλλω τὸν ἄγγελόν μου πρὸ προσώπου σου, ὃς κατασκευάσει τὴν ὁδόν σου ἔμπροσθέν σου.

In the King James Version of the Bible the text reads:

For this is he, of whom it is written, Behold, I send my messenger before thy face, which shall prepare thy way before thee.

The New International Version translates the passage as:

This is the one about whom it is written: "'I will send my messenger ahead of you, who will prepare your way before you.'

== Analysis ==
The words here are from Malachi 3:1, "Behold, I will send my messenger, and he shall prepare the way before me." The Greek word ἄγγελόν is angel, which can also be translated as messenger. Lapide notes that some people actually believed that John was an angel. The phrase, "who shall prepare your way," MacEvilly notes is allusive to the custom of preparing ways, by removing obstacles for the coming of a king into some part of their dominion. John, is said, by his preaching and baptism, to have "removed every obstacle to the proper reception of Christ; by his austere and heavenly life."

== Commentary from the Church Fathers ==
Gregory the Great: "For the Greek word Angel, is in Latin Nuntius, ‘a messenger.’ He therefore who came to bear a heavenly message is rightly called an Angel, that he may preserve in his title the dignity which he performs in his office."

Chrysostom: " He shows wherein it is that John is greater than the Prophets, namely, in that he is nigh unto Christ, as he says, I send before thy face, that is, near Thee, as those that walk next to the king's chariot are more illustrious than others, so likewise is John because of his nearness to Christ."

Pseudo-Chrysostom: " Also the other Prophets were sent to announce Christ's coming, but John to prepare His way, as it follows, who shall make ready thy way before thee;"

Glossa Ordinaria: "That is, shall open the hearts of Thy hearers by preaching repentance and baptizing."

Jerome: " Mystically; The desert is that which is deserted of the Holy Spirit, where there is no habitation of God; in the reed is signified a man who in outward show lives a pious life, but lacks all real fruit within himself, fair outside, within hollow, moved with every breath of wind, that is, with every impulse of unclean spirits, having no firmness to remain still, devoid of the marrow of the soul; by the garment wherewith his body is clothed is his mind shown, that it is lost in luxury and self-indulgence. The kings are the fallen angels; they are they who are powerful in this life, and the lords of this world. Thus, They that are clothed in soft raiment are in kings’ houses; that is, those whose bodies are enervated and destroyed by luxury, it is clear are possessed by dæmons."

Gregory the Great: "Also John was not clothed in soft raiment, that is, he did not encourage sinners in their sinful life by speaking smooth things, but rebuked them with sharpness and rigour, saying, Generation of vipers, &c. (Mat. 3:7)"

Preceded by Matthew 11:9	Gospel of Matthew; Chapter 11	Succeeded by Matthew 11:11
