= Matthew 10:40 =

- ← 10:39 10:41 →
- Book: Gospel of Matthew
- Christian Bible part: New Testament

Matthew 10:40 is a verse in the tenth chapter of the Gospel of Matthew in the New Testament.

== Content ==
In the original Greek according to Westcott-Hort this verse is:

Ὁ δεχόμενος ὑμᾶς ἐμὲ δέχεται· καὶ ὁ ἐμὲ δεχόμενος δέχεται τὸν ἀποστείλαντά με.

In the King James Version of the Bible, the text reads:

He that receiveth you receiveth me, and he that receiveth me receiveth him that sent me.

The New International Version translates the passage as:

"He who receives you receives me, and he who receives me receives the one who sent me".

== Analysis ==
Cornelius a Lapide likens the apostles to ambassadors, saying that the one who receives an ambassador of a king, receives the king who sent him. St. Paul uses similar language in 2 Corinthians 5:20, "We are ambassadors for Christ, as though God did beseech you by us", and in Galatians 4:14, "though my condition was a trial to you, you did not scorn or despise me, but received me as an angel of God, as Christ Jesus." Archbishop John McEvilly notes that Christ here proposes a reward for those that receive the apostles, which would help mitigate the poverty of the apostles.

== Commentary from the Church Fathers ==
Jerome: "The Lord when He sends forth His disciples to preach, teaches them that dangers are not to be feared, that natural affection is to be postponed to religion—gold He had above taken from them, brass He had shaken out of their purses—hard then surely the condition of the preachers! Whence their living? Whence their food and necessaries? Therefore He tempers the rigour of His precepts by the following promises, that in entertaining the Apostles each believer may consider that he entertains the Lord."

Chrysostom: "Enough had been said above to persuade those who should have to entertain the Apostles. For who would not with all willingness take in to his house men who were so courageous, that they despised all dangers that others might be saved? Above He had threatened punishment to those who should not receive them, He now promises reward to such as should receive them. And first He holds out to those who should entertain them the honour, that in so doing they were entertaining Christ, and even the Father; He who receiveth me, receiveth him that sent me. What honour to be compared to this of receiving the Father and the Son?"

Hilary of Poitiers: "These words show that He has a Mediator’s office, and since He came from God, when He is received by us, through Him God is transfused into us; and by this disposition of grace to have received the Apostles is no other than to have received God; for Christ dwells in them, and God in Christ."

Preceded by Matthew 10:39	Gospel of Matthew; Chapter 10	Succeeded by Matthew 10:41
