= Matthew 11:8 =

- ← 11:7 11:9 →
- Book: Gospel of Matthew
- Christian Bible part: New Testament

Matthew 11:8 is the eighth verse in the eleventh chapter of the Gospel of Matthew in the New Testament.

== Content ==
In the original Greek according to Westcott-Hort, this verse is:

Ἀλλὰ τί ἐξήλθετε ἰδεῖν; Ἄνθρωπον ἐν μαλακοῖς ἱματίοις ἠμφιεσμένον; Ἰδού, οἱ τὰ μαλακὰ φοροῦντες ἐν τοῖς οἴκοις τῶν βασιλέων εἰσίν.

In the King James Version of the Bible the text reads:

But what went ye out for to see? A man clothed in soft raiment? behold, they that wear soft clothing are in kings’ houses.

The New International Version translates the passage as:

If not, what did you go out to see? A man dressed in fine clothes? No, those who wear fine clothes are in kings' palaces.

== Analysis ==
John MacEvilly notes that luxurious living is more fitting for "the whims and caprices of the great". Rather the hard, unchangeable, John lived in the desert and was clothed with a hair cloth from his youth.

== Commentary from the Church Fathers ==
Jerome: "Was it for this ye went out into the desert to see a man like unto a reed, and carried about by every wind, so that in lightness of mind he doubts concerning Him whom once he preached? Or it may be he is roused against Me by the sting of envy, and he seeks empty honour by his preaching, that he may thereof make gain. Why should he covet wealth? that he may have dainty fare? But his food is locusts and wild honey. That he may wear soft raiment? But his clothing is camel’s hair. This is that He adds, But what went ye out for to see? A man clothed in soft raiment?"

Chrysostom: "Otherwise; That John is not as a waving reed, yourselves have shown by going out unto the desert to him. Nor can any say that John was once firm, but has since become wilful and wavering; for as some are prone to anger by natural disposition, others become so by long weakness and indulgence, so in inconstancy, some are by nature inconstant, some become so by yielding to their own humour and self-indulgence. But John was neither inconstant by natural disposition, this he means by saying, What went ye out for to see, a reed shaken by the wind? Neither had he corrupted an excellent nature by self-indulgence, for that he had not served the flesh is shown by his raiment, his abode in the desert, his prison. Had he sought soft raiment, he would not have dwelt in the desert, but in kings’ houses; Lo they that are clothed in soft raiment, are in kings’ houses."

Jerome: "This teaches that an austere life and strict preaching ought to shun kings’ courts and the palaces of the rich and luxurious."

Gregory the Great: "Let no one suppose that there is nothing sinful in luxury and rich dress; if pursuit of such things had been blameless, the Lord would not have thus commended John for the coarseness of his raiment, nor would Peter have checked the desire of fine clothes in women as he does, Not in costly raiment. (1 Peter 3:3)"

Augustine: "In all such things we blame not the use of the things, but the lust of those that use them. For whoever uses the good things in his reach more sparingly than are the habits of those with whom he lives, is either temperate or superstitious. Whoever again uses them in a measure exceeding the practice of the good among whom he lives, either has some meaning therein, or else is dissolute."

Preceded by Matthew 11:7	Gospel of Matthew; Chapter 11	Succeeded by Matthew 11:9
