= Matthew 11:2–3 =

Matthew 11:2-3
- ← 11:1 11:4 →
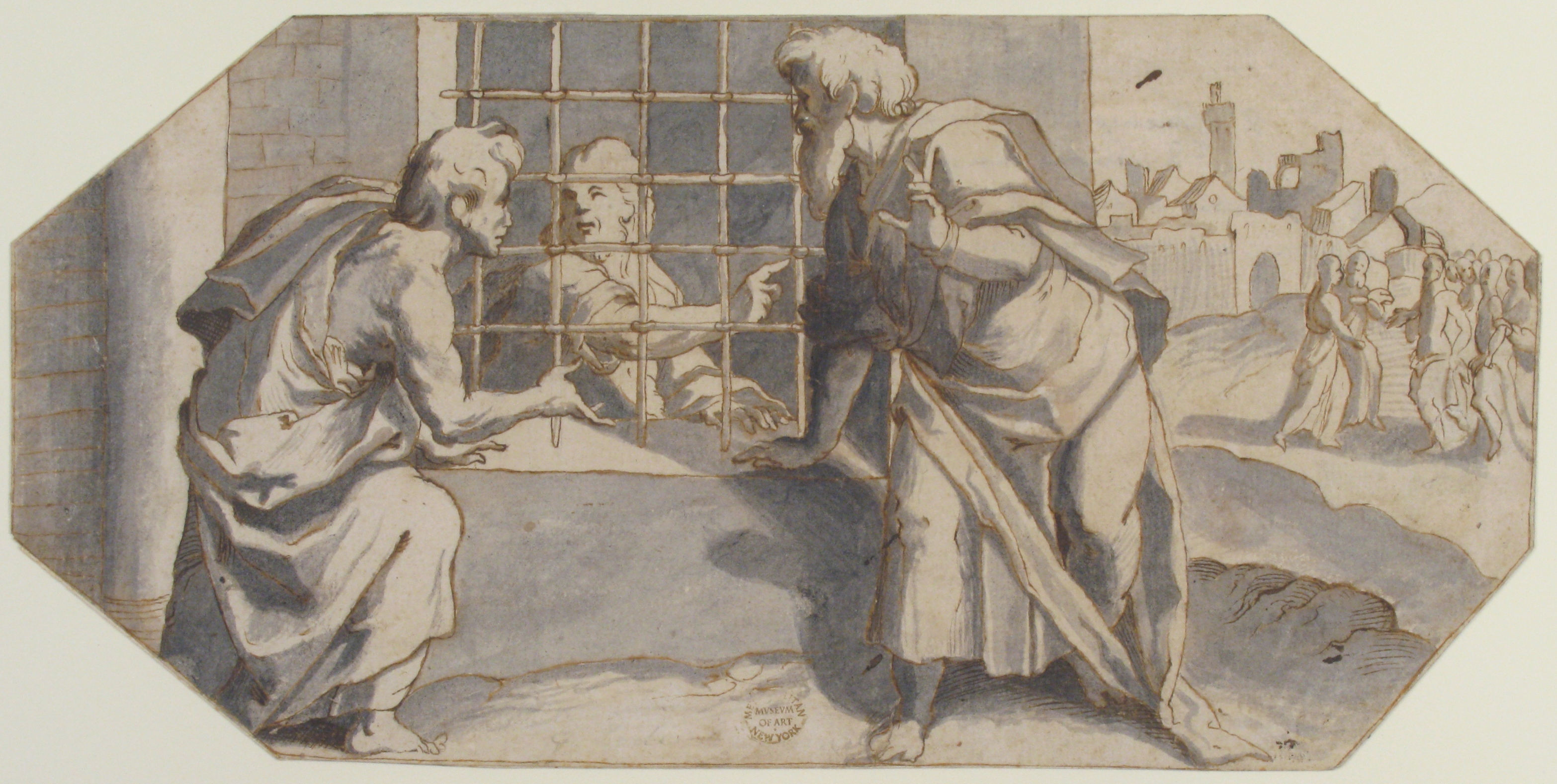
- "Saint John the Baptist in Prison Sends His Disciples to Question Jesus" by Ermenegildo Lodi (between 1598 and 1616).
- Book: Gospel of Matthew
- Christian Bible part: New Testament

Matthew 11:2–3 are the second and third verses in the eleventh chapter of the Gospel of Matthew in the New Testament.

== Content ==
In the original Greek according to Westcott-Hort, these verses are:

Ὁ δὲ Ἰωάννης ἀκούσας ἐν τῷ δεσμωτηρίῳ τὰ ἔργα τοῦ Χριστοῦ, πέμψας δύο τῶν μαθητῶν αὐτοῦ,
εἶπεν αὐτῷ, Σὺ εἶ ὁ ἐρχόμενος, ἢ ἕτερον προσδοκῶμεν;

In the King James Version of the Bible the text reads:

Now when John had heard in the prison the works of Christ, he sent two of his disciples,
And said unto him, Art thou he that should come, or do we look for another?

The New International Version translates the passage as:

When John heard in prison what Christ was doing, he sent his disciples
to ask him, "Are you the one who was to come, or should we expect someone else?"

== Analysis ==
Although it would appear from these verses that John the Baptist was uncertain about Jesus being the Messiah, the traditional understanding from many church fathers, as seen in the next section, is that John merely sent his disciples to Christ so that "they might learn from Himself that He was the very Messiah, or Christ, that when John was dead they might go to Him." The idea was to prevent a schism from forming, since it is clear from Matthew 9:14 that John's disciples held John in higher esteem than Christ. However, Tertullian and Justin believed that John was in fact misguided, even though he had seen the Holy Spirit descend upon him in the form of a dove and the voice from heaven. Gregory the Great thought that John did know that Jesus would save the world, but was ignorant that he would also be the one who would descend into hell and open its doors.

== Commentary from the Church Fathers ==
The following quotations are taken from the Catena Aurea of Thomas Aquinas, which only cited the names of the commentators, and generally did not give the name of the particular work that was cited. They are given in the order that Thomas put them, which was meant to build a narrative from the quotations.

Glossa Ordinaria: "The Evangelist had shown above how by Christ’s miracles and teaching, both His disciples and the multitudes had been instructed; he now shows how this instruction had reached even to John’s disciples, so that they seemed to have some jealousy towards Christ; John, when he had heard in his bonds the works of Christ, sent two of his disciples to say unto him, Art thou he that should come, or look we for another?"

Gregory the Great: "We must enquire how John, who is a prophet and more than a prophet, who made known the Lord when He came to be baptized, saying, Behold the Lamb of God, that taketh away the sins of the world!—why, when he was afterwards cast into prison, he should send his disciples to ask, Art thou he that should come, or look we for another? Did he not know Him whom he had pointed out to others; or was he uncertain whether this was He, whom by foretelling, by baptizing, and by making known, he had proclaimed to be He?"

Ambrose: "Some understand it thus; That it was a great thing that John should be so far a prophet, as to acknowledge Christ, and to preach remission of sin; but that like a pious prophet, he could not think that He whom he had believed to be He that should come, was to suffer death; he doubted therefore though not in faith, yet in love. So Peter also doubted, saying, This be far from thee, Lord; this shall not be unto thee. (Mat. 16:22.)"

Chrysostom: "But this seems hardly reasonable. For John was not in ignorance of His death, but was the first to preach it, saying, Behold the Lamb of God, that taketh away the sins of the world. For thus calling Him the Lamb, he plainly shows forth the Cross; and no otherwise than by the Cross did He take away the sins of the world. Also, how is he a greater prophet than these, if he knew not those things which all the prophets knew, for Isaiah says, He was led as a sheep to the slaughter. (Is. 53:7.)"

Gregory the Great: "(Aug, ubi sup) But this question may be answered in a better way if we attend to the order of time. At the waters of Jordan he had affirmed that this was the Redeemer of the world after he was thrown into prison, he enquires if this was He that should come—not that he doubted that this was the Redeemer of the world, but he asks that he may know whether He who in His own person had come into the world, would in His own person descend also to the world below."

Jerome: "Hence he frames his question thus, Art thou he that is to come? Not, Art Thou he that hast come? And the sense is, Direct me, since I am about to go down into the lower parts of the earth, whether I shall announce Thee to the spirits beneath also; or whether Thou as the Son of God may not taste death, but will send another to this sacrament?"

Chrysostom: "But is this a more reasonable explanation than the other? for why then did he not say, Art Thou Ho that is coming to the world beneath? and not simply, Art thou he that is to come? And the reason of his seeking to know, namely, that he might preach Him there, is even ridiculous. For the present life is the time of grace, and after death the judgment and punishment; therefore there was no need of a forerunner thither. Again, if the unbelievers who should believe after death should be saved, then none would perish; all would then repent and worship; for every knee shall bow, both of things in heaven, and things on earth, and things under the earth. (Phil. 2:10)"

Glossa Ordinaria: "But it ought to be observed, that Jerome and Gregory did not say that John was to proclaim Christ’s coming to the world beneath, to the end that the unbelievers there might be converted to the faith, but that the righteous who abode in expectation of Christ, should be comforted by His near approach."

Hilary of Poitiers: "It is indeed certain, that he who as forerunner proclaimed Christ’s coming, as prophet knew Him when He stood before him, and worshipped Him as Confessor when He came to him, could not fall into error from such abundant knowledge. Nor can it be believed that the grace of the Holy Spirit failed him when thrown into prison, seeing He should hereafter minister the light of His power to the Apostles when they were in prison."

Jerome: "Therefore he does not ask as being himself ignorant. But as the Saviour asks where Lazarus is buried (John 11:34.), in order that they who showed. Him the sepulchre might be so far prepared for faith, and believe that the dead was verily raised again—so John, about to be put to death by Herod, sends his disciples to Christ, that by this opportunity of seeing His signs and wonders they might believe on Him, and so might learn through their master’s enquiry. But John’s disciples had somewhat of bitterness and jealousy towards the Lord, as their former enquiry showed, Why do we and the Pharisees fast oft, but thy disciples fast not?"

Chrysostom: "Yet whilst John was with them he held them rightly convinced concerning Christ. But when he was going to die, he was more concerned on their behalf. For he feared that he might leave his disciples a prey to some pernicious doctrine, and that they should remain separate from Christ, to whom it had been his care to bring all his followers from the beginning. Had he said to them, Depart from me, for He is better than me, he would not have prevailed with them, as they would have supposed that he spoke this in humility, which opinion would have drawn them more closely to him. What then does he? He waits to hear through them that Christ works miracles. Nor did he send all, but two only, (whom perhaps he chose as more ready to believe than the rest,) that the reason of his enquiry might be unsuspected, and that from the things themselves which they should see they might understand the difference between him and Jesus."

Hilary of Poitiers: "John then is providing not for his own, but his disciples’ ignorance; that they might know that it was no other whom he had proclaimed, he sent them to see His works, that the works might establish what John had spoken; and that they should not look for any other Christ, than Him to whom His works had borne testimony."

Preceded by Matthew 11:1	Gospel of Matthew; Chapter 11	Succeeded by Matthew 11:4
