= Matthew 11:9 =

- ← 11:8 11:10 →
- Book: Gospel of Matthew
- Christian Bible part: New Testament

Matthew 11:9 is the ninth verse in the eleventh chapter of the Gospel of Matthew in the New Testament.

== Content ==
In the original Greek according to Westcott-Hort, this verse is:

Ἀλλὰ τί ἐξήλθετε ἰδεῖν; Προφήτην; Ναί, λέγω ὑμῖν, καὶ περισσότερον προφήτου.

In the King James Version of the Bible the text reads:

But what went ye out for to see? A prophet? yea, I say unto you, and more than a prophet.

The New International Version translates the passage as:

Then what did you go out to see? A prophet? Yes, I tell you, and more than a prophet.

== Analysis ==
In the preceding verses, Jesus declared what John was not and now he goes on to state what he was, i.e. a prophet. This was also the agreed opinion of the people: "All held John as a Prophet" (Matt 21:26). This prophetic nature of John is demonstrated by the fact that John knew Jesus, "by Divine instinct". However this appears to contrast with John's testimony that he was not a prophet (John 1:21). John MacEvilly says that he said this from humility, since he was not a prophet in the sense that he could predict future events.

That John was more than a prophet seems to be on account of His "miraculous birth, and angelic life". Also he was the subject of prophecy, being called "an angel" or "messenger", (Gk: αγγελλος), by "his office, not his nature".

== Commentary from the Church Fathers ==
Chrysostom: "Having described his habits of life from his dwelling-place, his dress, and the concourse of men to hear him, He now brings in that he is also a prophet, But what went ye out for to see? A prophet? yea, I say unto you, and more than a prophet."

Gregory the Great: "The office of a prophet is to foretel things to come, not to show them present. John therefore is more than a prophet, because Him whom he had foretold by going before Him, the same he showed as present by pointing Him out."

Jerome: "In this he is also greater than the other prophets, that to his prophetic privilege is added the reward of the Baptist that he should baptize his Lord."

Chrysostom: "Then he shows in what respect He is greater, saying, This is he of whom it is written, Behold, I send my angel before thy face."

Jerome: "To add to this great worthiness of John, He brings a passage from Malachias, in which he is spoken of as an Angel. (Mal. 3:1)) We must suppose that John is here called an Angel, not as partaking the Angelic nature, but from the dignity of his office as a forerunner of the Lord."

| Preceded by Matthew 11:8 | Gospel of Matthew; Chapter 11 | Succeeded by Matthew 11:10 |
