= Matthew 11:4–6 =

Matthew 11:4-6
- ← 11:3 11:7 →
- Book: Gospel of Matthew
- Christian Bible part: New Testament

Matthew 11:4-6 is a set of verses in the eleventh chapter of the Gospel of Matthew in the New Testament.

== Content ==
In the original Greek according to Westcott-Hort, these verses are:

4:Καὶ ἀποκριθεὶς ὁ Ἰησοῦς εἶπεν αὐτοῖς, Πορευθέντες ἀπαγγείλατε Ἰωάννῃ ἃ ἀκούετε καὶ βλέπετε·
5:τυφλοὶ ἀναβλέπουσι, καὶ χωλοὶ περιπατοῦσι, λεπροὶ καθαρίζονται, καὶ κωφοὶ ἀκούουσι, νεκροὶ ἐγείρονται, καὶ πτωχοὶ εὐαγγελίζονται·
6:καὶ μακάριός ἐστιν, ὃς ἐὰν μὴ σκανδαλισθῇ ἐν ἐμοί.

In the King James Version of the Bible the text reads:

4:Jesus answered and said unto them, Go and shew John again those things which ye do hear and see:
5:The blind receive their sight, and the lame walk, the lepers are cleansed, and the deaf hear, the dead are raised up, and the poor have the gospel preached to them.
6:And blessed is he, whosoever shall not be offended in me.

The New International Version translates the passage as:

4:Jesus replied, "Go back and report to John what you hear and see:
5:The blind receive sight, the lame walk, those who have leprosy are cured, the deaf hear, the dead are raised, and the good news is preached to the poor.
6:Blessed is the man who does not fall away on account of me."

== Analysis ==
Lapide states that Jesus seems to be saying, "these miracles which you have seen Me perform are the marks of the true Messiah." See Isaiah 35:5, "then shall the eyes of the blind be opened", and Isaiah 61:1 "He hath sent me to announce to the meek." According to MacEvilly verse 6 seems to be referring to the disciples of John, who were offended at His lowliness.

== Commentary from the Church Fathers ==
Chrysostom: "So also Christ as knowing the mind of John, said not, I am He; for thus He would have put an obstacle in the way of those that heard Him, who would have at least thought within themselves, if they did not say, what the Jews did say to Christ, Thou bearest witness of thyself. (John 8:13.) Therefore He would have them learn from His miracles, and so presented His doctrine to them more clear, and without suspicion. For the testimony of deeds is stronger than the testimony of words. Therefore He straightway healed a number of blind, and lame, and many other, for the sake not of John who had knowledge, but of others who doubted; as it follows, And Jesus answered and said unto them, Go and tell John what ye have heard and scen; The blind see, the lame walk, the lepers are cleansed, the deaf hear, the dead are raised, the poor have the Gospel preached to them."

Jerome: "This last is no less than the first. And understand it as if it had been said, Even the poor; that so between noble and mean, rich and poor, there may be no difference in preaching. This approves the strictness of the master, this the truth of the teacher, that in His sight every one who can be saved is equal."

Chrysostom: "And blessed is he who shall not be offended in me, is directed against the messengers; they were offended in Him. But He not publishing their doubts, and leaving it to their conscience alone, thus privately introduced a refutation of them."

Hilary of Poitiers: "This saying, that they were blessed from whom there should be no offence in Him, showed them what it was that John had provided against in sending them. For John, through fear of this very thing, had sent his disciples that they might hear Christ."

Gregory the Great: "Otherwise; The mind of unbelievers was greatly offended concerning Christ, because after many miracles done, they saw Him at length put to death; whence Paul speaks, We preach Christ crucified, to the Jews a stumbling-block. (1 Cor. 1:23.) What then does that mean, Blessed is he who shall not be offended in me, but a direct allusion to the humiliation of His death; as much as to say, I do indeed wonderful works, but do not disdain to suffer humble things. Because then I follow you in death, men must be careful not to despise in Me My death, while they reverence My wonderful works."

Hilary of Poitiers: "In these things which were done concerning John, there is a deep store of mystic meaning. The very condition and circumstances of a prophet are themselves a prophecy. John signifies the Law; for the Law proclaimed Christ, preaching remission of sins, and giving promise of the kingdom of heaven. Also when the Law was on the point of expiring, (having been, through the sins of the people, which hindered them from understanding what it spake of Christ, as it were shut up in bonds and in prison,) it sends men to the contemplation of the Gospel, that unbelief might see the truth of its words established by deeds."

Ambrose: "And perhaps the two disciples sent are the two people; those of the Jews, and those of the Gentiles who believed."

== Textual variants ==
- Papyrus 19 has the variant ουν νομίσητε (Therefore, you^{pl} think) instead of μη νομίσητε (Do not think).

| Preceded by Matthew 11:3 | Gospel of Matthew; Chapter 11 | Succeeded by Matthew 11:7 |
