= Matthew 10:42 =

- ← 10:41 11:1 →
- Book: Gospel of Matthew
- Christian Bible part: New Testament

Matthew 10:42 is a verse in the tenth chapter of the Gospel of Matthew in the New Testament.

== Content ==
In the original Greek according to Westcott-Hort for this verse is:

Καὶ ὃς ἐὰν ποτίσῃ ἕνα τῶν μικρῶν τούτων ποτήριον ψυχροῦ μόνον εἰς ὄνομα μαθητοῦ, ἀμὴν λέγω ὑμῖν, οὐ μὴ ἀπολέσῃ τὸν μισθὸν αὐτοῦ.

In the King James Version of the Bible the text reads:

And whosoever shall give to drink unto one of these little ones a cup of cold water only in the name of a disciple, verily I say unto you, he shall in no wise lose his reward.

The New International Version translates the passage as:

And if anyone gives even a cup of cold water to one of these little ones because he is my disciple, I tell you the truth, he will certainly not lose his reward."

== Analysis ==
MacEvilly notes that cold water is the cheapest possible thing, and within the reach of anyone to bestow. The "little ones" here is said to be anyone striving to lead a good life whether just or unjust. Here it said the followers of Christ were called disciples and later "Christians" in Antioch. (Acts 11:26) This is echoed later by St. Paul, "So then, as we have opportunity, let us do good to everyone, and especially to those who are of the household of faith." (Gal 6:10)

== Commentary from the Church Fathers ==
Jerome: " That none should say, I am poor and therefore cannot be hospitable, He takes away even this plea by the instance of a cup of cold water, given with good will. He says cold water, because in hot, poverty and lack of fuel might be pleaded. And whosoever shall give to drink to one of the least of these a cup of cold water only in the name of a disciple, verily I say unto you, he shall not lose his reward."

Saint Remigius: " The least of these, that is, not a prophet, or a righteous man, but one of these least."

Glossa Ordinaria: "Note, that God looks more to the pious mind of the giver, than to the abundance of the thing given."

Glossa Ordinaria: "Or, the least are they who have nothing at all in this world, and shall be judges with Christ."

Hilary of Poitiers: " Or; Seeing beforehand that there would be many who would only glory in the name of Apostleship, but in their whole life and walk would be unworthy of it, He does not therefore deprive of its reward that service which might be rendered to them in belief of their religious life. For though they were the very least, that is, the greatest of sinners, yet even small offices of mercy shown them, such as are denoted by the cup of cold water, should not be shown in vain. For the honour is not done to a man that is a sinner, but to his title of disciple."

Preceded by Matthew 10:41	Gospel of Matthew; Chapter 10	Succeeded by Matthew 11:1
