= Book of Malachi =

Book of the Hebrew Bible

- מַלְאָכִי
- ← Book of Zechariah Gospel of Matthew →
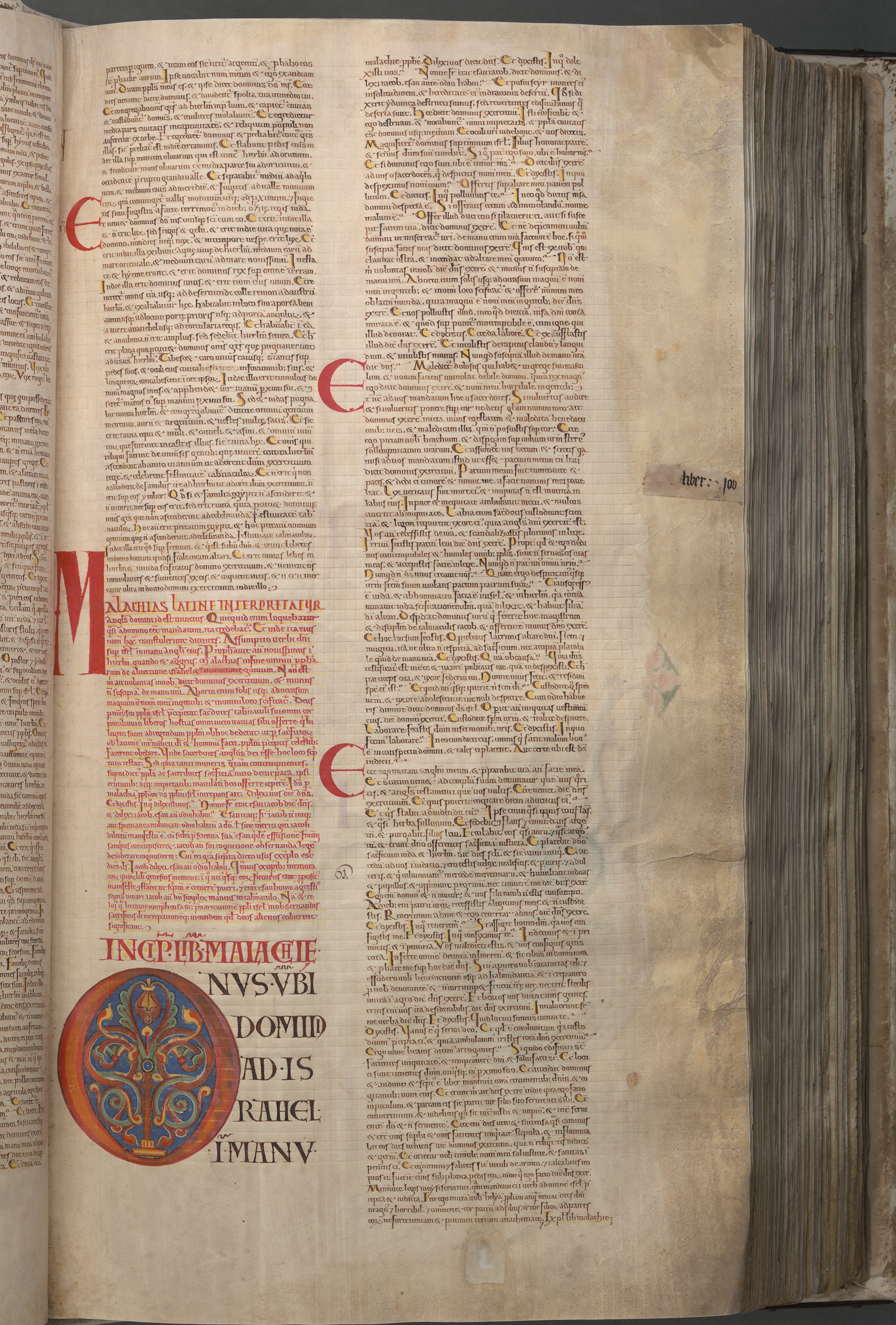
- The whole Book of Malachi in Latin as a part of Codex Gigas, made around the 13th century

Information
- Religion: Judaism; Christianity
- Author: Traditionally Malachi (or Ezra)
- Language: Hebrew
- Period: 500 BCE
- Chapters: 3 (Note: In the Hebrew Bible and Septuagint) or 4 (Note: In the Latin Vulgate)

Full text
- Book of Malachi at Hebrew Wikisource
- Malachi (Bible) at English Wikisource

The Book of Malachi (Hebrew: סֵפֶר מַלְאָכִי, romanized: Sēfer Malʾākhî) is the last book of the Nevi'im in the Tanakh (Hebrew Bible) and canonically the final book of the Twelve Minor Prophets. In most Christian traditions, the prophetic books form the last section of the Old Testament, making Malachi the last book before the New Testament. The book is divided into three chapters in the Hebrew Bible and Septuagint, and four in the Latin Vulgate. The fourth chapter in the Vulgate consists of the remainder of the third chapter, starting at verse 3:19.

The author of the text may or may not have been an eponymous figure named Malachi. While often regarded as a proper name, the meaning of the word is simply "my messenger" in the Hebrew language, and the Septuagint translation renders it as "his messenger." During the time the text was written, it was not used as a personal name. In tractate Megillah 15a of the Talmud, Rabbi Joshua ben Karha and Rav Nachman—both Tannaim—taught that the book was authored by Ezra the Scribe, a prominent scholar and kohen who played a significant role in shaping Jewish religious law (Halakha) and tradition.

Most scholars believe the book underwent multiple stages of redaction. The majority of its text originates in the Persian period; the oldest portions dating to c. 500 BCE. Later modifications occurred during the Hellenistic period.

== Oldest surviving manuscripts ==
The oldest surviving Hebrew manuscripts, containing some or all of this book, are found in the Masoretic Text tradition, which includes the Codex Cairensis (895), the Petersburg Codex of the Prophets (916), the Aleppo Codex (tenth century), and Codex Leningradensis (1008). Fragments containing parts of this book were also found among the Dead Sea Scrolls 4Q76 (150–125 BCE) and 4Q78 (75–50 BCE).

A translation of the Hebrew Bible into Koine Greek, known as the Septuagint, was made in the last few centuries BCE. Extant ancient manuscripts of the Septuagint version include Codex Vaticanus (fourth century), Codex Sinaiticus (fourth century), Codex Alexandrinus (fifth century), and Codex Marchalianus (sixth century).

== Authorship ==
The identity of the author of the Book of Malachi is uncertain, although it has been suggested that the author may have been Levitical. Due to the similarities between Malachi and Ezra's emphasis on forbidding marriage to foreign pagan women, the Talmud and certain Targums, such as Targum Jonathan, identify Ezra as the author of Malachi. This is the traditional view held by most Jews and some Christians. The Catholic priest and historian Jerome suggests that this may be because Ezra was seen as an intermediary between the prophets and the "great synagogue". According to Josephus, Ezra died and was buried "in a magnificent manner in Jerusalem". If the tradition that Ezra wrote under the name "Malachi" is correct, then he was likely buried in the Tomb of the Prophets, the traditional resting place of Malachi, Haggai, and Zechariah.

The name "Malachi" occurs in the superscription in the opening verse and in Malachi 3:1, although most consider it unlikely that the word refers to the same character in both references. According to the editors of the 1897 Easton's Bible Dictionary, some scholars believe the name "Malachi" is not a proper noun, but an abbreviation of "messenger of Yah". This reading could be based on Malachi 3:1, "Behold, I will send my messenger...", if "my messenger" is taken literally as the name Malachi. Thus, many believe that "Malachi" is an anonymous pseudonym. Other scholars, including the editors of the Catholic Encyclopedia, argue that the grammatical evidence leads to the conclusion that Malachi is a name, asserting: "We are no doubt in presence of an abbreviation of the name Mál'akhîyah, that is Messenger of Yah."

Some scholars consider the authorship of Zechariah 9–14 and Malachi to be anonymous which explains their placement at the end of the Twelve Minor Prophets. Julius Wellhausen, Abraham Kuenen, and Wilhelm Gustav Hermann Nowack argue that Malachi 1:1 is a late addition, pointing to Zechariah 9:1 and Zechariah 12:1 as evidence. Another interpretation of the authorship comes from the Septuagint superscription ὲν χειρὶ ἀγγήλου αὐτοῦ, which can be read as either "by the hand of his messenger" or as "by the hand of his angel." The "angel" reading found an echo among the ancient Church Fathers and ecclesiastical writers. It even gave rise to the "strangest fancies," especially among the disciples of Origen.

== Period ==
The Book of Malachi contains a few historical details. A clue as to its dating lies in the author's use of a loaned form of the Imperial Aramaic term for 'governor' (פחה, paḥā) to refer to the contemporary governor of Judah (Biblical Hebrew: לְפֶחָתֶךָ, romanized: lefeḥāthekha, lit. 'to your governor') in chapter 1:8. This indicates a post-Babylonian exile date of composition (i.e., after 538 BCE), based on the use of this term and the fact that Judah had a king before the exile. Additionally, since the same verse references the rebuilt Temple in Jerusalem, the book must have been written after 515 BCE during the Second Temple period. The author of the Book of Sirach, written early in the second century BCE, apparently knew of Malachi. Because of the development of themes in the book of Malachi, most scholars assign it to a position after the Book of Haggai and the Book of Zechariah, close to the time when Ezra and Nehemiah came to Jerusalem in 445 BCE.

== Aim ==
The Book of Malachi was written to correct what the author saw as the lax religious and social behavior of the Israelites—particularly the priests—in post-exilic Jerusalem. Although the prophets urged the people of Judah and Israel to see their exile as punishment for failing to uphold their covenant with God, it was not long after they had been returned to the land, the Second Temple built, and proper worship restored, that the people's commitment to their God began to wane once again. It was in this context that the prophet, commonly referred to as Malachi, delivered his prophecy.

The Book of Malachi draws upon various themes found in other books of the Hebrew Bible. Malachi appeals to the rivalry between Jacob and Esau and Yahweh's preference for Jacob contained in the Book of Genesis 25–28. Malachi reminds his audience that, as descendants of Jacob (Israel), they have been and continue to be favoured by God as God's chosen people. In the second dispute, Malachi draws upon the Levitical Code (e.g., Leviticus 1:3) in condemning the priests for offering unacceptable sacrifices.

== Structure ==
The New Revised Standard Version of the Bible supplies headings for the book as follows:

Verse/Chapter Headings in the NRSV
Verse Reference	Heading
1:1	(Superscription)
1:2–2:9	Israel Preferred to Edom
2:10–17	The Covenant Profaned by Judah
3:1–7	The Coming Messenger
3:8–18	Do Not Rob God
4:1–5 (3:19–24 in Hebrew)	The Great Day of the Lord

The majority of scholars consider the book to be made up of six distinct oracles. According to this scheme, the Book of Malachi consists of a series of disputes between Yahweh and the various groups within the Israelite community. In the book's three or four chapters, Yahweh is vindicated, while those who do not adhere to the Mosaic Law are condemned. Some scholars have suggested that the book, as a whole, is structured along the lines of a judicial trial, a suzerain treaty, or a covenant—one of the major themes throughout the Hebrew Bible. Implicit in the prophet's condemnation of Israel's religious practices is a call to keep Yahweh's statutes.

In the third dispute (concerning divorce), the author of the Book of Malachi likely intends his argument to be understood on two levels. Malachi appears to be attacking either the practice of divorcing Jewish wives in favour of foreign ones (a practice which Ezra vehemently condemns) or, alternatively, Malachi could be condemning the practice of divorcing foreign wives in favour of Jewish wives (a practice which Ezra promoted). Malachi appears adamant that nationality is not a valid reason to terminate a marriage, "For I hate divorce, says the Lord..." (2:16).

In many places throughout the Hebrew Bible, particularly in the Book of Hosea, Israel is figured as Yahweh's wife or bride. Malachi's discussion of divorce may also be understood to conform to this metaphor. Malachi could be urging his audience not to break faith in Yahweh (the God of Israel) by adopting new gods or idols. It is quite likely that since the people of Judah were questioning Yahweh's love and justice (1:2, 2:17), they might have been tempted to adopt foreign gods. William Sanford LaSor, an American Christian pastor, suggests that because the restoration to the land of Judah had not resulted in anything like the prophesied splendour of the Messianic Age, which had been foretold, the people were becoming quite disillusioned with their religion.

In 1:2, Malachi portrays the people of Israel as questioning God's love for them. This introduction to the book illustrates the severity of the situation that Malachi addresses, as does dialectical style with which Malachi confronts his audience. Malachi accuses his audience of failing to respect God as God deserves. One way this disrespect manifests is through the substandard sacrifices that Malachi claims the priests offer. While God demands animals that are "without blemish" (Leviticus 1:3, NRSV), the priests, who were "to determine whether the animal was acceptable" were offering blind, lame, and sick animals for sacrifice because they thought nobody would notice.

In 2:1, Malachi states that Yahweh Sabaoth is sending a curse on the priests who have not honoured him with appropriate animal sacrifices: "Now, watch how I am going to paralyze your arm and throw dung in your face—the dung from your very solemnities—and sweep you away with it. Then you shall learn that it is I who have given you this warning of my intention to abolish my covenant with Levi, says Yahweh Sabaoth."

In 2:10–11, Malachi addresses the issue of divorce. On this topic, Malachi deals with divorce both as a social problem ("Why then are we faithless to one another ... ?") and as a religious problem ("Judah...has married the daughter of a foreign god"). In contrast to the Book of Ezra, Malachi urges each to remain steadfast to the wife of his youth.

Malachi also criticizes his audience for questioning God's justice. He reminds them that God is just and exhorts them to be faithful as they await that justice. Malachi states that the people have not been faithful and have not given God all that God deserves. Just as the priests have been offering unacceptable sacrifices, so the people have been neglecting to offer their full tithe to God. Indeed, the fourth dispute asserts that judgment is coming in the form of a messenger who "is like refiner's fire and like fullers' soap..." (3:2).

Following this, the prophet provides another example of wrongdoing in the fifth dispute: failing to offer full tithes. In this discussion, Malachi has Yahweh request that the people "Bring the full tithe ... [and] see if I will not open the windows of heaven for you and pour down on you an overflowing blessing" (3:10). This request offers the opportunity for the people to amend their ways. It also stresses that keeping the Lord's statutes will allow the people to avoid God's wrath and lead to God's blessing. It is this portion of Malachi that supports the view that tithing remains one of the Hebrew Biblical commandments Christians must observe.

In the sixth dispute, the people of Israel illustrate the extent of their disillusionment. According to Malachi, they say, "'It is vain to serve God ... Now we count the arrogant happy; evildoers not only prosper, but when they put God to the test they escape'" (3:14–15). Once again, Yahweh assures the people that the wicked will be punished and the faithful will be rewarded.

In the light of what Malachi understands to be an imminent judgment, he exhorts his audience to "Remember the teaching of my servant Moses, that statutes and ordinances that I commanded him at Horeb for all Israel" (4:4; 3:22, MT). Before the Day of the Lord, Malachi declares that Elijah, who "ascended in a whirlwind into heaven...", will return to earth so that people might follow in God's ways.

== Interpretations ==
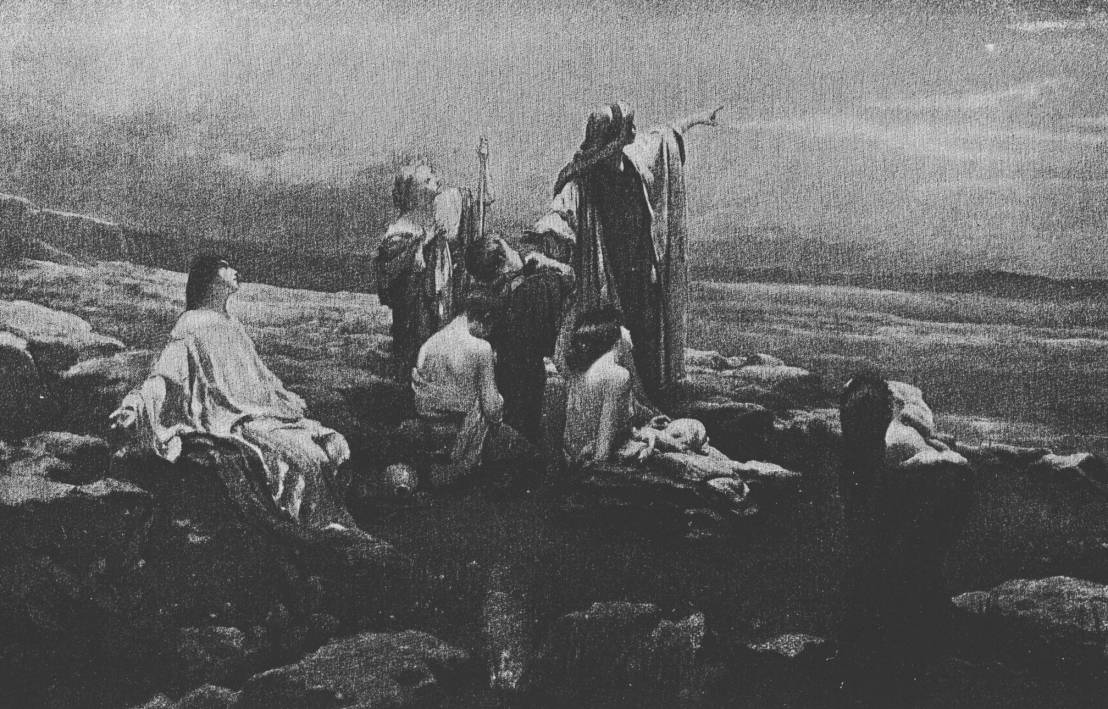
Illustration of the coming of God's Messenger in 3:1, by Franciszek Żmurko

=== Jewish ===
In Judaism the book is known as "the seal of the prophets" because it brings the books of biblical prophecy to a close.

Religious Jews, who do not share the messianic belief of Christians, continue to await the coming of the prophet Elijah, who will prepare the way for the Messiah.

=== Christian ===
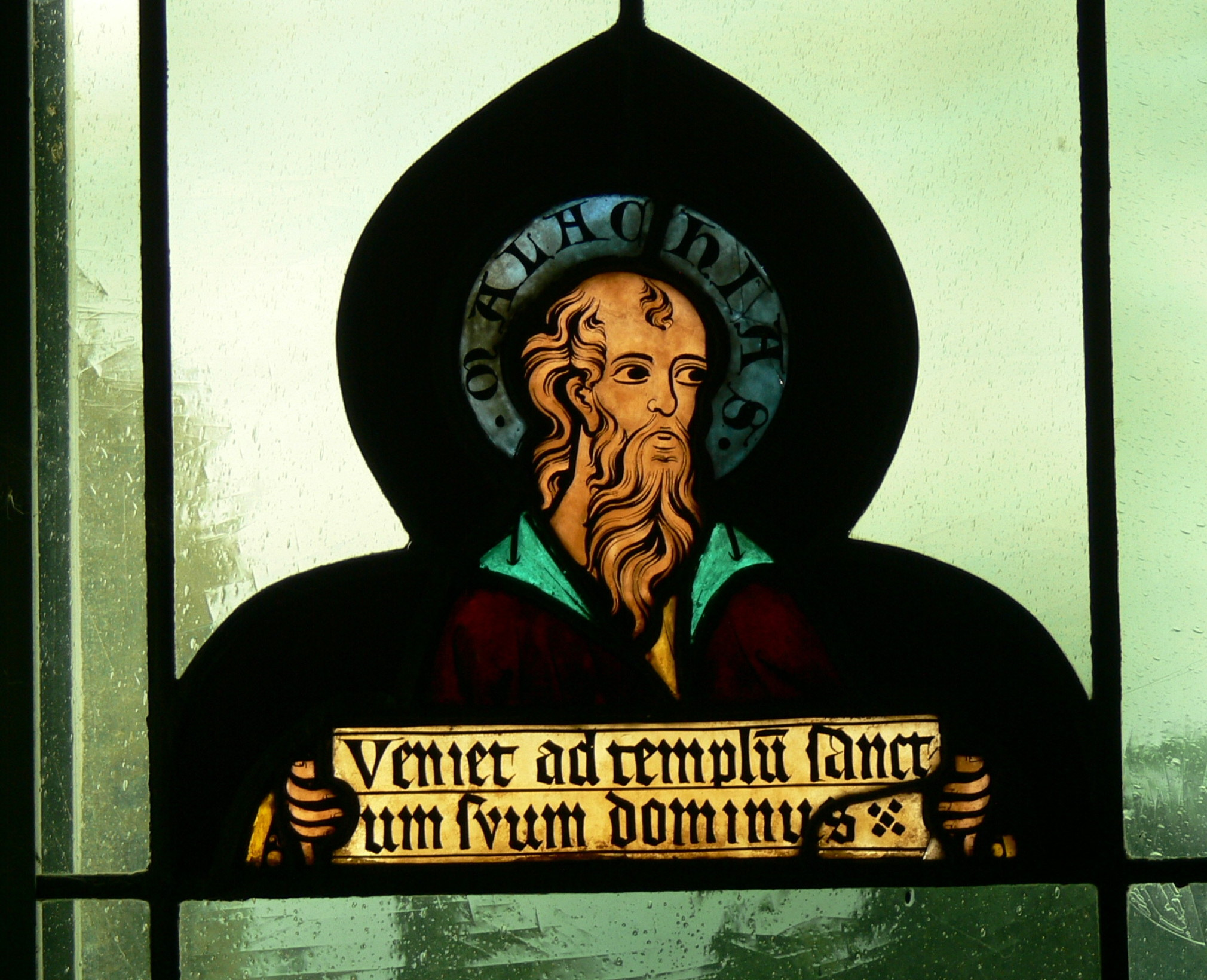
Quotation from Malachi 3:1 in the Basilica of Saint Lawrence, Enns, Austria: "The Lord shall come to his temple."

Many Christians believe that the messianic prophecies of the Book of Malachi have been fulfilled in Jesus's life.

The Book of Malachi is frequently cited in the Christian New Testament, primarily due to its messianic themes. The following is a brief comparison between the Book of Malachi and the New Testament passages that reference it.

References to the Book of Malachi in the New Testament (NRSV)
Malachi	New Testament
"Yet I have loved Jacob, but I have hated Esau." (1:2–3)	"'I have loved Jacob, but I have hated Esau.'" (Romans 9:13)
"And if I am a master, where is the respect due me?" (1:6)	"Why do you call me, 'Lord, Lord,' and do not do what I tell you?" (Luke 6:46)
"the table of YHWH" (1:7,12)	"the table of the Lord" (1 Corinthians 10:21)
"For from the rising of the sun to its setting my name is great among the nations," (1:11)	"so that the name of our Lord Jesus may be glorified in you" (2 Thessalonians 1:12)
"For from the rising of the sun to its setting my name is great among the nations," (1:11)	"Lord, who will not fear and glorify your name?" (Revelation 15:4)
"For the lips of a priest should guard knowledge, and people should seek instruction from his mouth, for he is the messenger of the Lord of hosts. But you have turned aside from the way; you have caused many to stumble by your instruction; you have corrupted the covenant of Levi, says the Lord of hosts," (2:7–8)	"therefore, do whatever they teach you and follow it; but do not do as they do, for they do not practice what they teach" (Matthew 23:3)
"Have we not all one father?" (2:10)	"yet for us there is one God, the Father" (1 Corinthians 8:6)
"See, I am sending my messenger to prepare the way before me" (3:1)	"See, I am sending my messenger ahead of you, who will prepare your way" (Mark 1:2)
"See, I am sending my messenger to prepare the way before me" (3:1)	"See, I am sending my messenger ahead of you, who will prepare your way before you" (Matthew 11:10, Luke 7:27)
"But who can endure the day of his coming, and who can stand when he appears?" (3:2)	"for the great day of their wrath has come, and who is able to stand?" (Revelation 6:17)
"and he will purify the descendants of Levi and refine them like gold and silver" (3:3)	"so that the genuineness of your faith . . . being more precious than gold that, though perishable, is tested by fire . . ." (1 Peter 1:7)
"against those who oppress the hired workers in their wages" (3:5)	"Listen! The wages of the laborers who mowed your fields, which you kept back by fraud" (James 5:4)
"For I, Jehovah, change not;" (3:6)	"Jesus Christ is the same yesterday and today and forever." (Hebrews 13:8)
"Return to me, and I will return to you," (3:7)	"Draw near to God, and he will draw near to you" (James 4:8)
"But for you who revere my name the sun of righteousness shall rise," (4:2)	"By the tender mercy of our God, the dawn from on high will break upon us," (Luke 1:78)
"Behold, I will send you Elijah the prophet before the great and terrible day of Jehovah come." (4:5)	"he is Elijah who is to come." (Matthew 11:14)
"Behold, I will send you Elijah the prophet before the great and terrible day of Jehovah come." (4:5)	"Elijah has already come," (Matthew 17:12)
"Behold, I will send you Elijah the prophet before the great and terrible day of Jehovah come." (4:5)	"Elijah has come," (Mark 9:13)
"Behold, I will send you Elijah the prophet before the great and terrible day of Jehovah comes. And he shall turn the heart of the fathers to the children, and the heart of the children to their fathers; lest I come and smite the earth with a curse." (4:5–6)	"With the spirit and power of Elijah he will go before him, to turn the hearts of parents to their children, and the disobedient to the wisdom of the righteous." (Luke 1:17)

== Bibliography ==
- Hill, Andrew E. (1998), Malachi: A New Translation with Introduction and Commentary, The Anchor Bible, vol. 25D, Toronto: Doubleday, ISBN 9780385468923.
- LaSor, William Sanford; Hubbard, David Allan; Bush, Frederic William (1996), Old Testament Survey: The Message, Form, and Background of the Old Testament, Grand Rapids, Michigan: William B. Eerdmans, ISBN 9780802835567
- Mason, Rex (1977), The Books of Haggai, Zechariah and Malachi, The Cambridge Bible Commentary on the New English Bible, New York: Cambridge University Press.
- Singer, Isidore; Guttmacher, Adolf (1906), "Book of Malachi", Jewish Encyclopedia.
- van Hoonacker, Albin (1910). "Malachias" . In Herbermann, Charles (ed.). Catholic Encyclopedia. Vol. 9. New York: Robert Appleton Company.

Book of Malachi Minor prophets
Preceded by Zechariah	Hebrew Bible	Succeeded by Psalms
Preceded by Zechariah	Christian; Old Testament	Succeeded by New Testament: Matthew
