= Matthew 10:39 =

- ← 10:38 10:40 →
- Book: Gospel of Matthew
- Christian Bible part: New Testament

Matthew 10:39 is a verse in the tenth chapter of the Gospel of Matthew in the New Testament.

== Content ==
In the original Greek according to Westcott-Hort for this verse is:

Ὁ εὑρὼν τὴν ψυχὴν αὐτοῦ ἀπολέσει αὐτήν· καὶ ὁ ἀπολέσας τὴν ψυχὴν αὐτοῦ ἕνεκεν ἐμοῦ εὑρήσει αὐτήν.

In the King James Version of the Bible the text reads:

He that findeth his life shall lose it: and he that loseth his life for my sake shall find it.

The New International Version translates the passage as:

Whoever finds his life will lose it, and whoever loses his life for my sake will find it.

== Analysis ==
The Greek word ψυχὴν used here means both soul and life. Cornelius a Lapide interprets this verse as, He that finds his life (ψυχὴν), which is, "the corporeal safety of life, when in peril of death, through denial of the faith", that such a person will lose his soul (ψυχὴν), i.e., the eternal salvation of his soul. By contrast, the one who will lose the present life of his soul (ψυχὴς), for the name of Christ will find eternal happiness and glory for his soul (ψυχὴν), or life. Lapide summarises by saying, "He therefore who indulges his soul, loses it: he who mortifies it, saves it. See the paradox which there is here. Life is made to consist in death, and death in life."

== Commentary from the Church Fathers ==
Chrysostom: "Because these commands seemed burdensome, He proceeds to show their great use and benefit, saying, He that findeth his life shall lose it. As much as to say, Not only do these things that I have inculcated do no harm, but they are of great advantage to a man; and the contrary thereof shall do him great hurt—and this is His manner everywhere. He uses those things which men’s affections are set upon as a means of bringing them to their duty. Thus: Why are you loath to contemn your life? Because you love it? For that very reason contemn it, and you will do it the highest service."

Saint Remigius: "The life in this place is not to be understood as the substance, (the soul,) but as this present state of being; and the sense is, He who findeth his life, i. e. this present life, he who so loves this light, its joys and pleasures, as to desire that he may always find them; he shall lose that which he wishes always to keep, and prepare his soul for eternal damnation."

Rabanus Maurus: "Otherwise; He who seeks an immortal life, does not hesitate to lose his life, that is, to offer it to death. But either sense suits equally well with that which follows, And whoso shall lose his life for my sake shall find it."

Saint Remigius: "That is, he who in confession of My name in time of persecution despises this temporal world, its joys, and pleasures, shall find eternal salvation for his soul."

Hilary of Poitiers: "Thus the gain of life brings death, the loss of life brings salvation; for by the sacrifice of this short life we gain the reward of immortality."

Preceded by Matthew 10:38	Gospel of Matthew; Chapter 10	Succeeded by Matthew 10:40
