= Matthew 11:13 =

- ← 11:12 11:14 →
- Book: Gospel of Matthew
- Christian Bible part: New Testament

Matthew 11:13 is the thirteenth verse in the eleventh chapter of the Gospel of Matthew in the New Testament.

== Content ==
In the original Greek according to Westcott-Hort for this verse is:

Πάντες γὰρ οἱ προφῆται καὶ ὁ νόμος ἕως Ἰωάννου προεφήτευσαν·

In the King James Version of the Bible the text reads:

For all the prophets and the law prophesied until John.

The New International Version translates the passage as:

For all the Prophets and the Law prophesied until John.

== Analysis ==
This verse (and the previous one) parallels Luke 16:16. Witham interprets it as if he had said, "all those who prophesied before, foretold the coming of the Messiah, but now John points him out as actually present with you, so that now all the types and figures of the ancient law are fulfilled and finished."

Lapide states that the Law of Moses and all the Prophets prophesied until the time of John, foretelling of Christ and His heavenly kingdom, by they promised earthly good things, such as an abundance of fruits of the earth oil, and a rich and peaceful earthly kingdom like Solomon's. However these were "a figure and a type of the celestial kingdom to be brought in by Christ." John was the first to openly preach this heavenly kingdom of Christ, and to point out Christ to the Jewish people.

== Commentary from the Church Fathers ==
Jerome: " Not that He cuts off all Prophets after John; for we read in the Acts of the Apostles that Agabus prophesied, and also four virgins daughters of Philip; but He means that the Law and the Prophets whom we have written, whatever they have prophesied, they have prophesied of the Lord. That He says, Prophesied until John, shows that this was now the time of Christ’s coming; and that whom they had foretold should come, Him John showed to be already come."

Preceded by Matthew 11:12	Gospel of Matthew; Chapter 11	Succeeded by Matthew 11:14
