= Matthew 11:14 =

- ← 11:13 11:15 →
- Book: Gospel of Matthew
- Christian Bible part: New Testament

Matthew 11:14 is the fourteenth verse in the eleventh chapter of the Gospel of Matthew in the New Testament.

== Content ==
In the original Greek according to Westcott-Hort for this verse is:

καὶ εἰ θέλετε δέξασθαι, αὐτός ἐστιν Ἠλίας ὁ μέλλων ἔρχεσθαι.

In the King James Version of the Bible the text reads:

And if ye will receive it, this is Elias, which was for to come.

The New International Version translates the passage as:

And if you are willing to accept it, he is the Elijah who was to come.

== Analysis ==
This verse occurs also in Luke 1:17 where he makes it clear that John comes in the spirit of Elijah not the person. Commentators make it clear this is not a transmigration of souls. John parallels Elijah in his austere life, and sufferings. For Elijah upbraided Ahab and Jezabel because of their impieties, while John censured the unlawful marriage of Herod and Herodias, and died for it.

== Commentary from the Church Fathers ==
Chrysostom: " Then He adds another token of him, saying, And if ye will receive it, this is Elias who was to come. (Malachi 4:5) The Lord speaks in Malachias, I will send you Elias the Tishbite; and of the same again, Behold, I send my messenger before thy face."

Jerome: " John then is said to be Elias, not according to the foolish philosophers, and certain heretics who bring forward their metempsychosis, or passing of the soul from one body to another; but because (as it is in another passage of the Gospel) he came in the spirit and power of Elias, and had the same grace and measure of the Holy Spirit. But in austerity of life, and fortitude of spirit, Elias and John were alike; they both dwelt in the desert, both were girded with a girdle of skins; because he reproved Ahab and Jezebel for their wickedness, Elias was compelled to fly; because he condemned the unlawful union of Herod and Herodias, John is beheaded."

Chrysostom: " If ye will receive it, showing their freedom, and requiring of them a willing mind. John the Baptist is Elias, and Elias is John, because both were forerunners of Christ."

Jerome: " That He says, This is Elias, is figurative, and needs to be explained, as what follows, shows; He that hath ears to hear, let him hear."

Saint Remigius: " As much as to say, Whoso has ears of the heart to hear, that is, to understand, let him understand; for He did not say that John was Elias in person, but in the Spirit."

Preceded by Matthew 11:13	Gospel of Matthew; Chapter 11	Succeeded by Matthew 11:15
