= Matthew 10:36 =

- ← 10:35 10:37 →
- Book: Gospel of Matthew
- Christian Bible part: New Testament

Matthew 10:36 is a verse in the tenth chapter of the Gospel of Matthew in the New Testament.

== Content ==
The original Greek for this verse, according to Westcott-Hort, is:

καὶ ἐχθροὶ τοῦ ἀνθρώπου οἱ οἰκιακοὶ αὐτοῦ.

In the King James Version of the Bible the text reads:

And a man’s foes shall be they of his own household.

The New International Version translates the passage as:

a man's enemies will be the members of his own household.

The Vulgate version is:

et inimici hominis domestici eius.

== Analysis ==
It is said by Robert Witham that Jesus here alludes to our own passions of love, hatred, anger, envy, etc., and that these are our greatest enemies. Against these "we must make use of the sword our Saviour came to send amongst men". Irish Archbishop John MacEvilly says that it refers to Micah 5:9, and that it may be an allusion to the time of the Siege of Jerusalem (70 CE) when people would forsake their closest relatives doing anything to survive.

== Commentary from the Church Fathers ==
Jerome: "For in the matter of belief in Christ, the whole world was divided against itself; each house had its believers and its unbelievers; and therefore was this holy war sent, that an unholy peace might be broken through."

Chrysostom: "This He said as it were comforting His disciples, as much as to say, Be not troubled as though these things fell upon you unexpectedly; for, for this cause I came that I might send war upon the earth—nay He says not ‘war,’ but what is yet harder, a sword. For He sought by sharpness of speech so to rouse their attention, that they should not fall off in time of trial and difficulty, or say that He had told them smooth things, and had hid the difficulties. For it is better to meet with softness in deeds than in words; and therefore He stayed not in words, but showing them the nature of their warfare, He taught them that it was more perilous than a civil war; saying, I am come to set a man against his father, and daughter against her mother, and daughter-in-law against her mother-in-law. So this warfare will be between not acquaintances merely, but the nearest and dearest kindred; and this shows Christ's very great power; that His disciples after having heard this, yet undertook the mission, and brought over others. Yet was it not Christ who made this division, but the evil nature of the parties; when He says that it is He that does it, He speaks according to the manner of Scripture. As it is written, God hath given them eyes that they should not see. (Is. 6:10.) Here is also a great proof that the Old Testament is like the New. For among the Jews a man was to put his neighbour to death if he found him making a calf, or sacrificing to Baalphegor; so here to show that it was the same God who ordained both that and these precepts, He reminds them of the prophecy, A man's foes are they of his household. For this same thing happened among the Jews; there were Prophets, and false Prophets; there the multitude was divided, and houses were set against themselves; there some believed one part, and some another."

Jerome: "These are almost the words of the Prophet Micah (Micah 7:6). We should always take note when a passage is cited out of the Old Testament, whether the sense only, or the very words are given."

Hilary of Poitiers: "Mystically; A sword is the sharpest of all weapons, and thence it is the emblem of the right of authority, the impartiality of justice, the correction of offenders. The word of God, we may remember, is likened to a sword; (Eph. 6:17. Heb. 4:12.) so here the sword that is sent upon the earth is His preaching poured into the heart of man. The five inhabiting one house, whom He divides three against two, and two against three, we may explain thus; The three are the three parts of man, the body, the soul, and the will; for as the soul is bestowed in the body, so the will has power of using both in any way it chooses; and thence when a law is given it is given to the will. But this is only found in those who were first formed by God. By the sin and unbelief of the first parent, all the generations of men since have had sin for the father of their body, and unbelief for the mother of their soul. And as each man has his will within him, there are thus five in one house. When then we are renewed in the laver of baptism, by virtue of the word we are set apart from our original guilt, and severed, as it were, by the sword of God, from the lusts of this our father and mother, and thus there is great discord made in one house; the new man finding his foes within, he seeks with joy to live in newness of spirit; they which are derived from the old stock, lust to remain in their old pleasures."

Augustine: "Otherwise; I am come to set a man against his father; for he renounces the Devil, who was his son; the daughter against her mother, that is, the people of God against the city of the world, that is, the wicked society of mankind, which is spoken of in Scripture under the names of Babylon, Egypt, Sodom, and other names. The daughter-in-law against her mother-in-law, that is, the Church against the Synagogue, which according to the flesh, brought forth Christ the spouse of the Church. They are severed by the sword of the Spirit, which is the word of God. And a man’s foes are they of his household, those, that is, with whom he before lived as intimates."

Rabanus Maurus: "For no other mutual rights can be preserved between those who are at war in their creeds."

Glossa Ordinaria: "Otherwise; He means, I am not come among men to strengthen their carnal affections, but to cut them off with the sword of the Spirit; whence it is rightly added, And a man’s foes are they of his household."

Gregory the Great: "For the subtle enemy when he sees himself driven out of the hearts of the good, seeks out those who most love them, and speaking by the mouth of those who are dearest, endeavours while the heart is penetrated by love, that the sword of conviction may pierce to the inmost bulwarks of virtue."

Preceded by Matthew 10:35	Gospel of Matthew; Chapter 10	Succeeded by Matthew 10:37
