= Matthew 10:37 =

- ← 10:36 10:38 →
- Book: Gospel of Matthew
- Christian Bible part: New Testament

Matthew 10:37 is a verse in the tenth chapter of the Gospel of Matthew in the New Testament.

== Content ==
In the original Greek according to Westcott-Hort for this verse is:

Ὁ φιλῶν πατέρα ἢ μητέρα ὑπὲρ ἐμέ, οὐκ ἔστι μου ἄξιος· καὶ ὁ φιλῶν υἱὸν ἢ θυγατέρα ὑπὲρ ἐμέ, οὐκ ἔστι μου ἄξιος·

In the King James Version of the Bible the text reads:

He that loveth father or mother more than me is not worthy of me: and he that loveth son or daughter more than me is not worthy of me.

The New International Version translates the passage as:

"Anyone who loves his father or mother more than me is not worthy of me; anyone who loves his son or daughter more than me is not worthy of me;

== Analysis ==
Lapide states that the words, "is not worthy of me," has the sense of not being worthy to have Jesus for his Lord and Master, and not being worthy of His name and company, nor His grace, kingdom, and the rest of His promises (see Luke 14:26, "He cannot be my disciple"). The reason Lapide gives for this is that Christ is our God, Lord and Saviour, and so he must be far preferred to all else. MacEvilly puts it, "the love of our parents should yield to our love of God."

== Commentary from the Church Fathers ==
Jerome: " Because of what He had said, I am not come to send peace but a sword, &c. that none might suppose that family affection was banished from His religion, He now adds, He that loves father or mother more than me is not worthy of me. So in the Song of Songs we read, Order love in me. (c. 2:4.) For this order is needed in every affection; after God love thy father, thy mother, and thy children; but if a necessity should occur that the love of parents and children comes into competition with the love of God, and where both cannot be preserved, remember that hatred of our kindred becomes then love to God. He forbids not to love parent or child, but adds emphatically, more than me."

Hilary of Poitiers: " For they who have esteemed domestic affection of relations higher than God, are unworthy to inherit good things to come."

Chrysostom: " Yet when Paul bids us obey our parents in all things, we are not to marvel; for we are only to obey in such things as are not hurtful to our piety to God. It is holy to render them every other honour, but when they demand more than is due, we ought not to yield. This is likewise agreeable to the Old Testament; in it the Lord commands that all who worshipped idols, should not only be held in abhorrence, but should be stoned. And in Deuteronomy it is said, He who saith to his father and his mother, I know you not; and to his brethren, Ye are strangers; he hath kept thy saying. (Deut. 33:9.)"

Glossa Ordinaria: "It seems to happen in many cases that the parents love the children more than the children love the parents; therefore having taught that His love is to be preferred to the love of parents, as in an ascending scale, He next teaches that it is to be preferred to the love of children, saying, And whoso loveth son or daughter more than me is not worthy of me."

Rabanus Maurus: " He is unworthy of the divine communion who prefers the carnal affection of kindred to the spiritual love of God."

Preceded by Matthew 10:36	Gospel of Matthew; Chapter 10	Succeeded by Matthew 10:38
