= Matthew 11:7 =

- ← 11:6 11:8 →
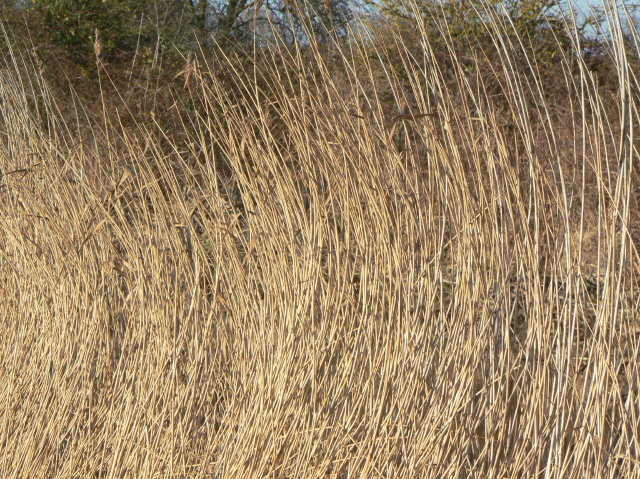
- "A reed shaken by the wind" Grantham Canal (2009).
- Book: Gospel of Matthew
- Christian Bible part: New Testament

Matthew 11:7 is the seventh verse in the eleventh chapter of the Gospel of Matthew in the New Testament.

== Content ==
In the original Greek according to Westcott-Hort, this verse is:

Τούτων δὲ πορευομένων, ἤρξατο ὁ Ἰησοῦς λέγειν τοῖς ὄχλοις περὶ Ἰωάννου, Τί ἐξήλθετε εἰς τὴν ἔρημον θεάσασθαι; Κάλαμον ὑπὸ ἀνέμου σαλευόμενον;

In the King James Version of the Bible the text reads:

And as they departed, Jesus began to say unto the multitudes concerning John, What went ye out into the wilderness to see? A reed shaken with the wind?

The New International Version translates the passage as:

As John's disciples were leaving, Jesus began to speak to the crowd about John: "What did you go out into the desert to see? A reed swayed by the wind?

== Analysis ==
Lapide notes that the Greek word, σαλευόμενον (shaking) can be used for waves of the sea or corn waving. So in effect telling people not to suppose that John had changed his opinion concerning Christ, at one point thinking Him to be the Messiah and then doubting. MacEvilly notes that a reed is changeable, like a light person pushed around, and that it bears no fruit.

== Commentary from the Church Fathers ==
Chrysostom: "Sufficient had been now done for John’s disciples; they returned certified concerning Christ by the wonderful works which they had seen. But it behoved that the multitude also should be corrected, which had conceived many things amiss from the question of John’s disciples, not knowing the purpose of John in sending them. They might say, He who bare such witness to Christ, is now of another mind, and doubts whether this be He. Doth he this because he hath jealousy against Jesus? Has the prison taken away his courage? Or spake he before but empty and untrue words?"

Hilary of Poitiers: "Therefore that this might not lead them to think of John as though he were offended concerning Christ, it continues, When they had gone away, Jesus began to speak to the multitudes concerning John."

Chrysostom: "As they departed, that He should not seem to speak flattery of the man; and in correcting the error of the multitude, He does not openly expose, their secret suspicions, but by framing his words against what was in their hearts, He shows that He knows hidden things. But He said not as to the Jews, Why think ye evil in your hearts? though indeed it was evil that they had thought; yet it proceeded not from wickedness, but from ignorance; therefore He spake not to them harshly, but answered for John, showing that he had not fallen from his former opinion. This He teaches them, not by His word only, but by their own witness, the witness of their own actions, as well as their own words. What went ye out into the wilderness to see? As much as to say, Why did ye leave the towns and go out into the wilderness? So great multitudes would not have gone with such haste into the desert, if they had not thought that they should see one great, and wonderful, one more stable than the rock."

Pseudo-Chrysostom: "They had not gone out at this time into the desert to see John, for he was not now in the desert, but in prison; but He speaks of the past time while John was yet in the desert, and the people flocked to him."

Chrysostom: "And note that making no mention of any other fault, He clears John of fickleness, which the multitude had suspected him of, saying, A reed shaken by the wind?"

Gregory the Great: "This He proposes, not to assert, but to deny. For if but a breath of air touch a reed, it bends it one way or other; a type of the carnal mind, which leans to either side, according as the breath of praise or detraction reaches it. A reed shaken by the wind John was not, for no variety of circumstance bent him from his uprightness. The Lord’s meaning then is,"

| Preceded by Matthew 11:6 | Gospel of Matthew; Chapter 11 | Succeeded by Matthew 11:8 |
