= Matthew 10:41 =

Whoever welcomes a prophet as a prophet will receive a prophet’s reward, and whoever welcomes a righteous person as a righteous person will receive a righteous person’s reward.

== Content ==
In the original Greek according to Westcott-Hort, this verse is:

Ὁ δεχόμενος προφήτην εἰς ὄνομα προφήτου μισθὸν προφήτου λήψεται· καὶ ὁ δεχόμενος δίκαιον εἰς ὄνομα δικαίου μισθὸν δικαίου λήψεται.

In the King James Version of the Bible the text reads:

He that receiveth a prophet in the name of a prophet shall receive a prophet’s reward; and he that receiveth a righteous man in the name of a righteous man shall receive a righteous man’s reward.

The New International Version translates the passage as:

Anyone who receives a prophet because he is a prophet will receive a prophet's reward, and anyone who receives a righteous man because he is a righteous man will receive a righteous man's reward.

== Analysis ==
Lapide believes that here Christ is referring to the apostles as prophets, since they were teaching and preaching of the Gospel, and in earlier times prophets not only predicted the future, but also taught the people. The reward of a prophet has been interpreted in a number of ways. It appears to allude to a similar rule in the old law of war. “There shall be an equal share to him who goes down into the battle with him who remains by the baggage. They shall alike divide the spoils.” (1 Sam. 30:24). St. Jerome believed that the one that helps a prophet receives the gift of prophecy itself, since the prophet Obadiah obtained it because he fed the prophets with bread and water during the persecution of Jezebel.

== Commentary from the Church Fathers ==
Chrysostom: "A further reward also He promises, saying, He who receiveth a prophet in the name of a prophet, shall receive a prophet’s reward. He said not merely, Whoso receiveth a prophet, or a righteous man, but in the name of a prophet, and in the name of a righteous man; that is, not for any greatness in this life, or other temporal account, but because he is a prophet, or a righteous man."

Jerome: "Otherwise; To this His exhortation to the disciple to entertain his teacher, there might a secret objection arise among the faithful; then shall we have to support the false prophets, or Judas the traitor. To this end it is that the Lord instructs them in these words, that it is not the person but the office that they should look to; and that the entertainer loses not his reward, though he whom he entertains be unworthy."

Chrysostom: "A prophet’s reward, and a righteous man’s reward, are such rewards as it is fitting he should have who entertains a prophet, or a righteous man: or, such a reward as a prophet or righteous man should have."

Gregory the Great: "He says not, a reward from a prophet, or righteous man, but the reward of a prophet or righteous man. For the prophet is perhaps a righteous man, and the less he possesses in this world, the greater confidence has he in speaking in behalf of righteousness. He who hath of this world’s goods, in supporting such a man, makes himself a free partaker in his righteousness, and shall receive the reward of righteousness together with him whom he has aided by supporting him. He is full of the spirit of prophecy, but he lacks bodily sustenance, and if the body be not supported, it is certain that the voice will fail. Whoso then gives a prophet food, gives him strength for speaking, therefore together with the prophet he shall receive the prophet’s reward, when he shows before the face of God what bounty he showed him."

Jerome: "Mystically; He who receives a prophet as a prophet, and understands him speaking of things to come, he shall receive reward of that prophet. The Jews therefore, who understand the prophets carnally, do not receive the prophet’s reward."

Saint Remigius: "Some understand by the prophet here, the Lord Jesus Christ, of whom Moses says, A Prophet shall the Lord your God raise up unto you; (Deut. 18:18.) and the same also by the righteous man, because he is beyond comparison righteous. He then who shall receive a prophet or righteous man in the name of the prophet or righteous man, i.e. of Christ, shall receive reward from Him for love of whom he received Him."

Preceded by Matthew 10:40	Gospel of Matthew; Chapter 10	Succeeded by Matthew 10:42
