= Matthew 11:1 =

- ← 10:42 11:2 →
- Book: Gospel of Matthew
- Christian Bible part: New Testament

Matthew 11:1 is the first verse in the eleventh chapter of the Gospel of Matthew in the New Testament.

== Content ==
In the original Greek according to Westcott-Hort, this verse is:

Καὶ ἐγένετο ὅτε ἐτέλεσεν ὁ Ἰησοῦς διατάσσων τοῖς δώδεκα μαθηταῖς αὐτοῦ, μετέβη ἐκεῖθεν τοῦ διδάσκειν καὶ κηρύσσειν ἐν ταῖς πόλεσιν αὐτῶν.

In the King James Version of the Bible the text reads:

And it came to pass, when Jesus had made an end of commanding his twelve disciples, he departed thence to teach and to preach in their cities.

The New International Version translates the passage as:

After Jesus had finished instructing his twelve disciples, he went on from there to teach and preach in the towns of Galilee.

The Amplified Bible, New Century Version and The Voice translation also add reference to "Galilee", and Heinrich Meyer identifies "their towns" with the Galilean towns from which the multitude had been drawn to listen to Jesus, linking this verse with Matthew 4:23 and Matthew 9:35.

== Analysis ==
Dale Allison sees verse 1 as a "transitional sentence". Jesus continues to preach, but he is alone at this point. Cornelius a Lapide believes that this verse indicates that Jesus separated Himself from His Apostles, whom He sent to preach the Gospel. A brief synopsis of what the apostles did is related in Luke 9:6 and Mark 6:12.

It was during the absence of the twelve that a delegation from John the Baptist arrived.

== Commentary from the Church Fathers ==
Rabanus Maurus: "The Lord having sent out His disciples to preach with the foregoing instructions, Himself now fulfils in action what He had taught in words, offering His preaching first to the Jews; And it came to pass when Jesus had ended all these sayings, he passed thence."

Chrysostom: "Having sent them forth, He withdrew Himself, giving them opportunity and time to do the things that He had enjoined; for while He was present and ready to heal, no man would come to His disciples."

Saint Remigius: "He well passes from the special teaching which He had delivered to His disciples, to the general which He preached in the cities; passing therein as it were from heaven to earth, that He might give light to all. By this deed of the Lord, all holy preachers are admonished that they should study to benefit all."

Preceded by Matthew 10:42	Gospel of Matthew; Chapter 11	Succeeded by Matthew 11:2
