= Matthew 10:38 =

- ← 10:37 10:39 →
- Book: Gospel of Matthew
- Christian Bible part: New Testament

Matthew 10:38 is a verse in the tenth chapter of the Gospel of Matthew in the New Testament.

== Content ==
In the original Greek according to Westcott-Hort for this verse is:

καὶ ὃς οὐ λαμβάνει τὸν σταυρὸν αὐτοῦ καὶ ἀκολουθεῖ ὀπίσω μου, οὐκ ἔστι μου ἄξιος.

In the King James Version of the Bible the text reads:

And he that taketh not his cross, and followeth after me, is not worthy of me.

The New International Version translates the passage as:

and anyone who does not take his cross and follow me is not worthy of me.

== Analysis ==
Archbishop John McEvilly comments on the words, "take his cross", saying that this implies cheerfully, willingly, and patiently taking it up "from the hands of God". The cross is often interpreted as suffering, and even a cruel death, if necessary. He notes that it is "his cross", since, "by God's special providence, He knows best what cross to send each individual, as He may destine it for him." In this verse Jesus clearly alludes to the cross he himself would carry on his shoulders.

Robert Witham states that there are two types of cross which Jesus here bids his disciples to take up: one physical, and the other spiritual. By the first, he bids us to "restrain the unruly appetites of the touch, taste, sight, etc." By the second, he teaches us to "govern the affections of the mind, and restrain all its irregular motions, by humility, tranquillity, modesty, peace, etc."

== Commentary from the Church Fathers ==
Chrysostom: " Then that those to whom the love of God is preferred should not be offended thereat, He leads them to a higher doctrine. Nothing is nearer to a man than his soul, and yet He enjoins that this should not only be hated, but that a man should be ready to deliver it up to death, and blood; not to death only, but to a violent and most disgraceful death, namely, the death of the cross; therefore it follows, And whoso taketh not up his cross and followeth me, is not worthy of me. He had as yet said nothing to them respecting his own sufferings, but instructs them in the meanwhile in these things, that they may the more readily receive His words concerning His passion."

Hilary of Poitiers: " Or; They that are Christ’s have crucified the body with its vices and lusts. (Gal. 5:24.) And he is unworthy of Christ who does not take up His cross, in which we suffer with Him, die with Him, are buried and rise again with Him, and follow his Lord, purposing to live in newness of spirit in this sacrament of the faith."

Gregory the Great: "The cross is so called from 1torment; and there are two ways in which we bear the Lord’s cross; either when we afflict the flesh by abstinence; or when in compassion for our neighbour we make his afflictions our own. But it should be known that there are some who make a show of abstinence not for God, but for ostentation; and some there are who show compassion to their neighbour, not spiritually but carnally, not that they may encourage him in virtue, but rather countenancing him in faults. These indeed seem to bear their cross, but do not follow the Lord; therefore He adds, And followeth me"

| Preceded by Matthew 10:37 | Gospel of Matthew; Chapter 10 | Succeeded by Matthew 10:39 |
