= Matthew 10:32 =

- ← 10:31 10:33 →
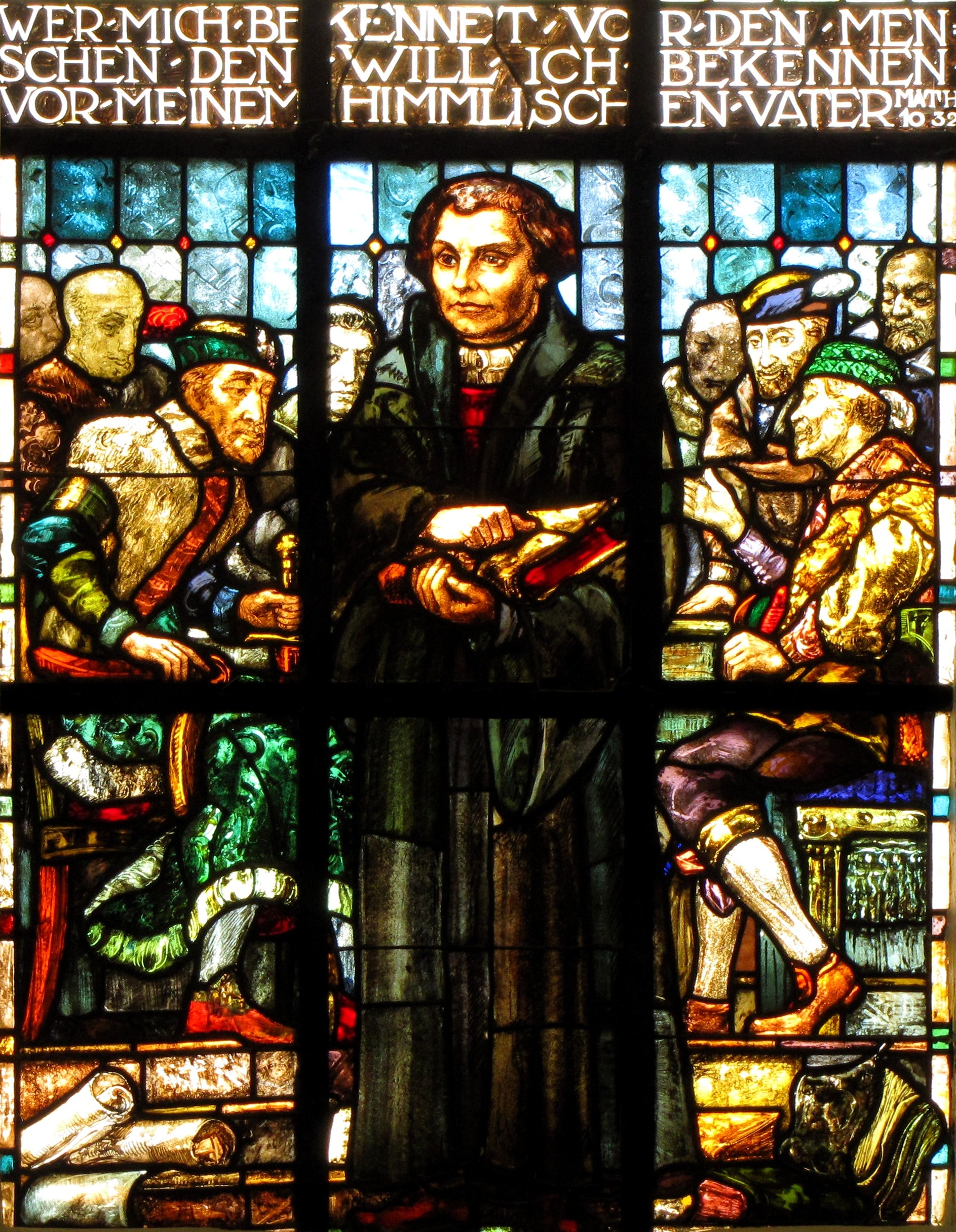
- "Luther et la Diète de Worms en 1521" with Matthew 10:32 in German, on the window of Église protestante de Notre Seigneur Jésus-Christ de Bischheim, Alsace, Bas-Rhin. Joseph Ehrismann (1880-1937).
- Book: Gospel of Matthew
- Christian Bible part: New Testament

Matthew 10:32 is the 32nd verse in the ninth chapter of the Gospel of Matthew in the New Testament.

== Content ==
In the original Greek according to Westcott-Hort for this verse is:

Πᾶς οὖν ὅστις ὁμολογήσει ἐν ἐμοὶ ἔμπροσθεν τῶν ἀνθρώπων, ὁμολογήσω κἀγὼ ἐν αὐτῷ ἔμπροσθεν τοῦ πατρός μου τοῦ ἐν οὐρανοῖς.

In the King James Version of the Bible the text reads:

Whosoever therefore shall confess me before men, him will I confess also before my Father which is in heaven.

The New International Version translates the passage as:

"Whoever acknowledges me before men, I will also acknowledge him before my Father in heaven.

== Analysis ==
MacEvilly points out that here Jesus bids his disciples to persevere to the end, by witnessing to the faith openly before others, with the reward that, "I shall honour him before all mankind on the Day of Judgment." (See Mark 8:38) Lapide states that, "from this word confess, martyrs were anciently called confessors."

== Commentary from the Church Fathers ==
Chrysostom: " The Lord having banished that fear which haunted the minds of His disciples, adds further comfort in what follows, not only casting out fear, but by hope of greater rewards encouraging them to a free proclamation of the truth, saying, Every man who shall confess me before men, I also will confess him before my Father which is in heaven. And it is not properly shall confess me, but as it is in the Greek, shall confess in me, showing that it is not by your own strength but by grace from above, that you confess Him whom you do confess."

Saint Remigius: " Here is to be understood that confession of which the Apostle speaks, With the heart men believe unto justification, with the month confession is made unto salvation. (Rom. 10:10.) That none therefore might suppose that he could be saved without confession of the mouth, He says not only, He that shall confess me, but adds, before men; and again, He that shall deny me before men, him will I also deny before my Father which is in heaven."

Hilary of Poitiers: " This teaches us, that in what measure we have borne witness to Him upon earth, in the same shall we have Him to bear witness to us in heaven before the face of God the Father."

Hilary of Poitiers: " This He says in conclusion, because it behoves them after being confirmed by such teaching, to have a confident freedom in confessing God."

Preceded by Matthew 10:31	Gospel of Matthew; Chapter 10	Succeeded by Matthew 10:33
