= Biblia Hebraica =

Biblia Hebraica may refer to:

- The texts of the Hebrew Bible
- The Jewish canon specifically, see Tanakh
- Editions of the Masoretic Text of the Tanakh
- Biblia Hebraica (Kittel) (BHK), 1906, 1913, 1937, the three editions of the Hebrew Bible edited by Rudolf Kittel (BHK)
- Biblia Hebraica Stuttgartensia (BHS), 1968–1976; 1997
- Biblia Hebraica Quinta (BHQ), 2004–(est. 2020)
