= Matthew 11:22 =

- ← 11:21 11:23 →
- Book: Gospel of Matthew
- Christian Bible part: New Testament

Matthew 11:22 is the 22nd verse in the eleventh chapter of the Gospel of Matthew in the New Testament.

== Content ==
In the original Greek according to Westcott-Hort for this verse is:

Πλὴν λέγω ὑμῖν, Τύρῳ καὶ Σιδῶνι ἀνεκτότερον ἔσται ἐν ἡμέρᾳ κρίσεως, ἢ ὑμῖν.

In the King James Version of the Bible the text reads:

But I say unto you, It shall be more tolerable for Tyre and Sidon at the day of judgment, than for you.

The New International Version translates the passage as:

But I tell you, it will be more bearable for Tyre and Sidon on the day of judgment than for you.

== Analysis ==
It said to be inferred from this passage that Christians will be more strictly punished on judgment day than those from other faiths, priests more than laypersons; monks more than seculars, since the greater degrees of grace and knowledge given from God the more the responsibility to make use of them.

== Commentary from the Church Fathers ==
Jerome: " And to these are preferred Tyre and Sidon, cities given up to idolatry and vices; For if the mighty works which have been done in you had been done in Tyre and Sidon, they would have long ago done penitence in sackcloth and ashes."

Gregory the Great: "In sackcloth is the roughness which denotes the pricking of the conscience for sin, ashes denote the dust of the dead; and both are wont to be employed in penitence, that the pricking of the sackcloth may remind us of our sins, and the dust of the ash may cause us to reflect what we have become by judgment."

Rabanus Maurus: " Tyre and Sidon axe cities of Phœnicia. Tyre is interpreted ‘narrowness,’ and Sidon ‘hunting;’ and denote the Gentiles whom the Devil as a hunter drives into the straits of sin; but Jesus the Saviour sets them free by the Gospel."

Jerome: " We ask where it is written that the Lord did wonders in Corozaim and Bethsaida? We read above, And he went about the towns and villages, healing all sicknesses, &c. (ch., 9:35.) among the rest, therefore, we may suppose that He wrought signs in Corozaim and Bethsaida."

Augustine: "It is not then true that His Gospel was not preached in those times and places, in which He foreknew that all would be such, as were many in His actual presence, who would not even believe on Him when He raised men from the dead. For the Lord Himself bears witness that they of Tyre and Sidon would have done penitence in great humility, had the wonders of the Divine power been done in them. Moreover, if the dead are judged according to those deeds which they would have done had they lived, then because these would have believed had the Gospel been preached to them with so great miracles, surely they should not be punished at all, and yet in the day of judgment they shall be punished; for it follows, But I say unto you, It shall be more tolerable for Tyre and Sidon in the day of judgment, than for you. Those then shall be punished with more, these with less severity."

Jerome: " This is because Tyre and Sidon had trodden under foot the law of nature only, but these towns after they had transgressed the natural and the written Law, also made light of those wonders which had been wrought among them."

Rabanus Maurus: " We at this day see the words of the Saviour fulfilled; Corozaim and Bethsaida would not believe when the Lord came to them in person; but Tyre and Sidon have afterwards believed on the preaching of the Apostles."

Preceded by Matthew 11:21	Gospel of Matthew; Chapter 11	Succeeded by Matthew 11:23
