= Matthew 11:23 =

- ← 11:22 11:24 →
- Book: Gospel of Matthew
- Christian Bible part: New Testament

Matthew 11:23 is the 23rd verse in the eleventh chapter of the Gospel of Matthew in the New Testament.

== Content ==
In the original Greek according to Westcott-Hort for this verse is:

Καὶ σύ, Καπερναούμ, ἡ ἕως τοῦ οὐρανοῦ ὑψωθεῖσα, ἕως ᾍδου καταβιβασθήσῃ· ὅτι εἰ ἐν Σοδόμοις ἐγένοντο αἱ δυνάμεις αἱ γενόμεναι ἐν σοί, ἔμειναν ἂν μέχρι τῆς σήμερον.

In the King James Version of the Bible the text reads:

And thou, Capernaum, which art exalted unto heaven, shalt be brought down to hell: for if the mighty works, which have been done in thee, had been done in Sodom, it would have remained until this day.

The New International Version translates the passage as:

And you, Capernaum, will you be lifted up to the skies? No, you will go down to the depths. If the miracles that were performed in you had been performed in Sodom, it would have remained to this day.

== Analysis ==
Lapide points out that Capernaum has become exalted by Jesus' miracles and doctrine and preaching, not its wealth and prosperity. However for not receiving Jesus, they will be brought down to Hades, which the KJV renders as 'hell' while the NIV gives 'depths.' The particle ἂν in the Greek is sometimes rendered as "perhaps," (i.e. it would have perhaps remained.) in other passages, but here Lapide and others believe this would be an incorrect rendering, since the uncertainly referred to here is due to the free-will of the inhabitants of Sodom rather than an imperfect awareness of the outcome by Jesus.

See Woes to the unrepentant cities.

== Commentary from the Church Fathers ==
Saint Remigius: " Capharnaum was the metropolis of Galilee, and a noted town of that province, and therefore the Lord mentions it particularly, saying, And thou, Capharnaum, shalt thou indeed be exalted to heaven. Thou shalt go down even to hell."

Jerome: " In other copies we find, And thou, Capharnaum, that art exalted to heaven, shalt be brought down to hell; and it may be understood in two different ways. Either, thou shalt go down to hell because thou hast proudly resisted my preaching; or, thou that hast been exalted to heaven by entertaining me, and having my mighty wonders done in thee, shalt be visited with the heavier punishment, because thou wouldest not believe even these."

Preceded by Matthew 11:22	Gospel of Matthew; Chapter 11	Succeeded by Matthew 11:24
