= Matthew 11:16 =

- ← 11:15 11:17 →
- Book: Gospel of Matthew
- Christian Bible part: New Testament

Matthew 11:16 is the sixteenth verse in the eleventh chapter of the Gospel of Matthew in the New Testament.

== Content ==
In the original Greek according to Westcott-Hort for this verse is:

Τίνι δὲ ὁμοιώσω τὴν γενεὰν ταύτην; Ὁμοία ἐστὶ παιδαρίοις ἐν ἀγοραῖς καθημένοις, καὶ προσφωνοῦσι τοῖς ἑταίροις αὐτῶν,

In the King James Version of the Bible the text reads:

But whereunto shall I liken this generation? It is like unto children sitting in the markets, and calling unto their fellows,

The New International Version translates the passage as:

"To what can I compare this generation? They are like children sitting in the marketplaces and calling out to others:

== Analysis ==
Lapide believes that "this generation" refers to the Scribes and Pharisees, so that the parable speaks of them not being induced to change their life and be converted, either by "the example of the austere life of John, or by the less stern life of Christ." He states that this dancing was not the pleasure-based one that we are normally used to, but rather a spiritual dance, like St. Paul when in Phil 3:13, he wrote that for our sakes, "he stretched himself out, and forgetting the things which were behind, and reaching forth unto those which were before, he strove for the prize of Christ." There also seems to be an allusion to Ezek. 33:32, "You are to them as a song of music which is very sweetly sung. And they hear your words, but they will not do them." So as MacEvilly writes, "we have sung the song of the New Testament, and you have not danced. We have lamented and you have not repented."

== Commentary from the Church Fathers ==
Hilary of Poitiers: " The whole of this speech is a reproach of unbelief, and arises out of the foregoing complaint; that the stiff-necked people had not learned by two different modes of teaching."

Chrysostom: " Whence He puts this question, showing that nothing had been omitted that ought to be done for their salvation, saying, To whom shall I liken this generation?"

Glossa Ordinaria: "By this generation He means the Jews together with Himself and John. As though He had said; John is thus great; but ye would believe neither him nor Me, and therefore to whom shall I liken you?"

Preceded by Matthew 11:15	Gospel of Matthew; Chapter 11	Succeeded by Matthew 11:17
