= Papyrus 62 =

Biblical manuscript

Papyrus 𝔓^{62}
- New Testament manuscript
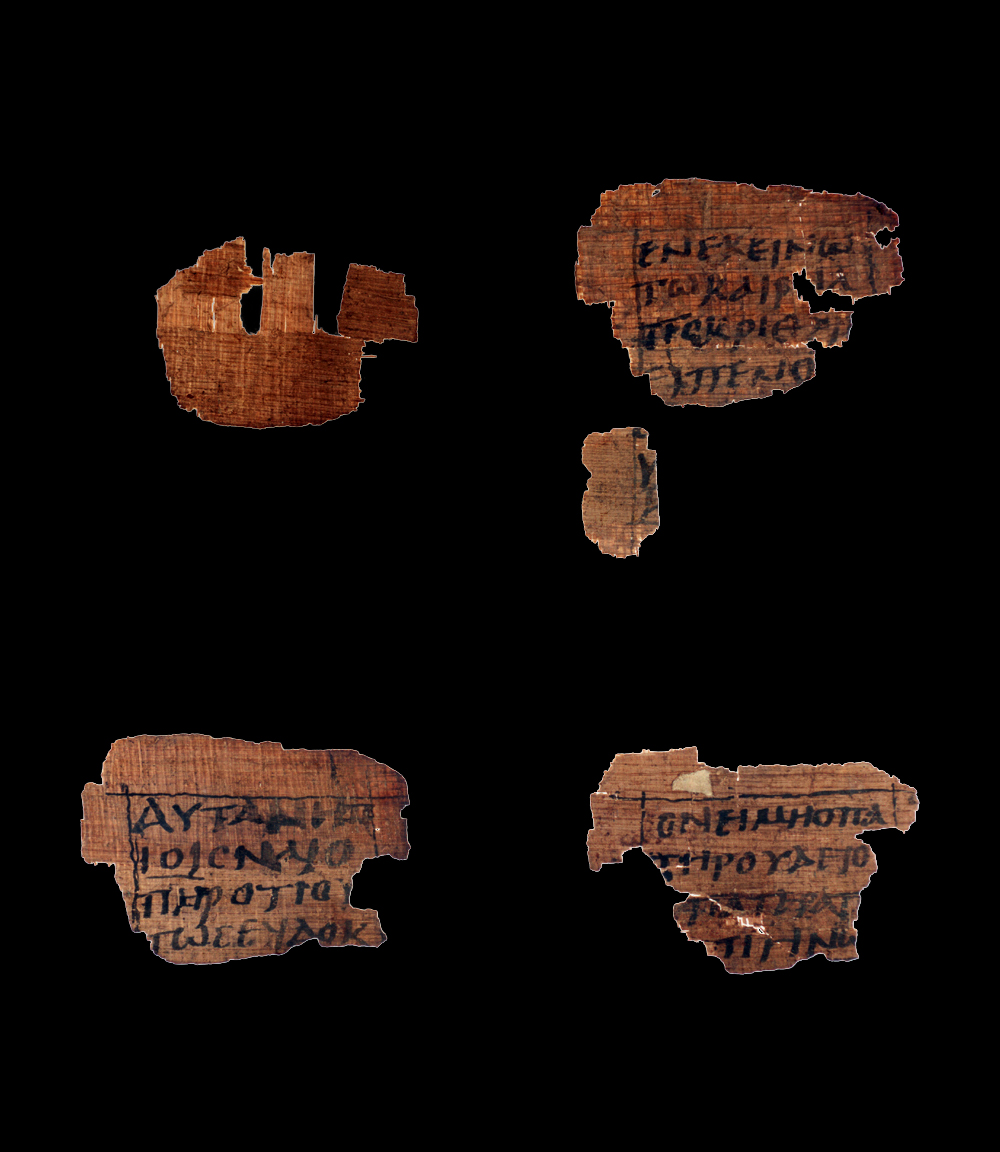
- Papyrus fragments 1, 3, 5, 7 recto, Matthew 11:25–27
- Name: Papyrus Osloensis 1661
- Text: Gospel of Matthew †
- Date: 4th century
- Script: Greek-Coptic
- Found: Egypt
- Now at: University of Oslo
- Cite: L. Amundsen, Christian Papyri from the Oslo Collection, Symbolae Osloenses 24 (1945), pp. 121-147.
- Size: 6.5 cm x 5.6 cm
- Type: Alexandrian text-type
- Category: II

Papyrus 62, also known as "Papyrus Osloensis", is a copy of the New Testament and Septuagint in Greek and Coptic known as a diglot. It is designated by the siglum 𝔓^{62} in the Gregory-Aland numbering of New Testament manuscripts. It is a papyrus manuscript of the Gospel of Matthew and Book of Daniel in a fragmentary condition. Using the study of comparative writing styles (palaeography), it has been assigned to the 4th century CE.

== Description ==
The original manuscript would have been a codex (precursor to the modern book) made of papyrus. It has only survived in a fragmentary condition, containing evidence of Matthew 11:25–30, Daniel 3:51–53, and some verses from the Book of Odes. The Daniel and Odes portions are labelled as Papyrus 994 in the Alfred Rahlf's numbering of Greek Septuagint manuscripts. The surviving fragments evidence around 13 leaves of the original codex. The text is written in one column per page, 7 lines per column, 7–12 letters in line. It has diaeresis over the letter upsilon.

Contents
Greek

Matthew 11:25; 11:25; 11:25-26; 11:27; 11:27; 11:27-28; 11:28-29; 11:29-30; 11:30.

Coptic

Matthew 11:25-29.

The manuscript contains evidence of the nomina sacra (sacred names, these being words/titles considered sacred in Christianity). The following are seen within the manuscript: θ̅ς̅ (θεος / God), ι̅ς̅ (Ιησους / Jesus), κ̅ε̅ (κυριε / Lord/Master), π̅ρ̅ (πατηρ / Father), π̅η̅ρ̅ (πατηρ / Father), and υ̅ς̅ (υιος / son).

Transcription of Greek text of Matthew

^{25}εν εκεινω τω καιρω̣ αποκριθεις̣ ειπεν ο [ι̅ς̅] ε̣[ξομολογο]υ[μαι] [σοι] [π̅ρ̅] κ̅[ε̅] [του] [ουρα]
νου και της γ̣η̣ς οτι εγρ̣υ̣ψας ταυ[τ]α̣ απο σο[φων] [και] [συ]ν̣[ετων] [και] απ[εκαλυψας]
αυτα νηπιοις ^{26} ναι ο π̅η̅ρ̅ οτι ουτως ευδοκι̣[α] –
^{27} παντα μοι παρεδοθη υπο̣ του π̣α̣τ̣[ρ]ο̣ς̣ μ̣ο̣υ̣ – [υι]
ον ει μη ο πατηρ ουδε το[ν] πατερα τ[ις] [ε]π̣ιγινω[σκει] –
αποκαλυψαι ^{28} δ̣ε̣υτε προς μ̣ε παντε[ς] [οι] κοπιον̣[τες] – [αναπα]
υσω υμας ^{29} α̣ρατε τον ζ̣υ̣[γο]ν μου εφ̣ [υμ]α̣ς̣ και μ̣α[θετε] – [τα]
πεινος τ̣η κ[αρ]δ̣ια και ευ[ρ]η̣σ̣ε̣τε αν̣[απα]υ̣σιν ταις –
^{30} και τ̣ο φορτιον μου ελα̣[φρο]ν εστιν

== Text ==
The Greek text of the Gospel of Matthew is considered a representative of the Alexandrian text-type. Biblical scholar Kurt Aland placed it in Category II of his New Testament manuscript classification system. In Matthew 11:25 it reads εκρυψας along with Codex Sinaiticus, Vaticanus, Bezae, minuscule 33, and lectionary 2211. Other manuscripts read απεκρυψας (C, L, W, Θ ƒ^{1}, ƒ^{13}, Byz). The text of Daniel represents Theodotion's recension.

== History ==
Leiv Amundsen dated the manuscript to the 4th century. INTF dated it to the 4th century. The manuscript was found in Egypt. The text was published by Amundsen in 1945. It was examined by Maldfeld, Kurt Treu, and Karl Jaroš.

It is cited in critical editions of the New Testament (NA26, NA27). It is currently housed at the University of Oslo Library (Inv. 1661) in Oslo.

== Image gallery ==
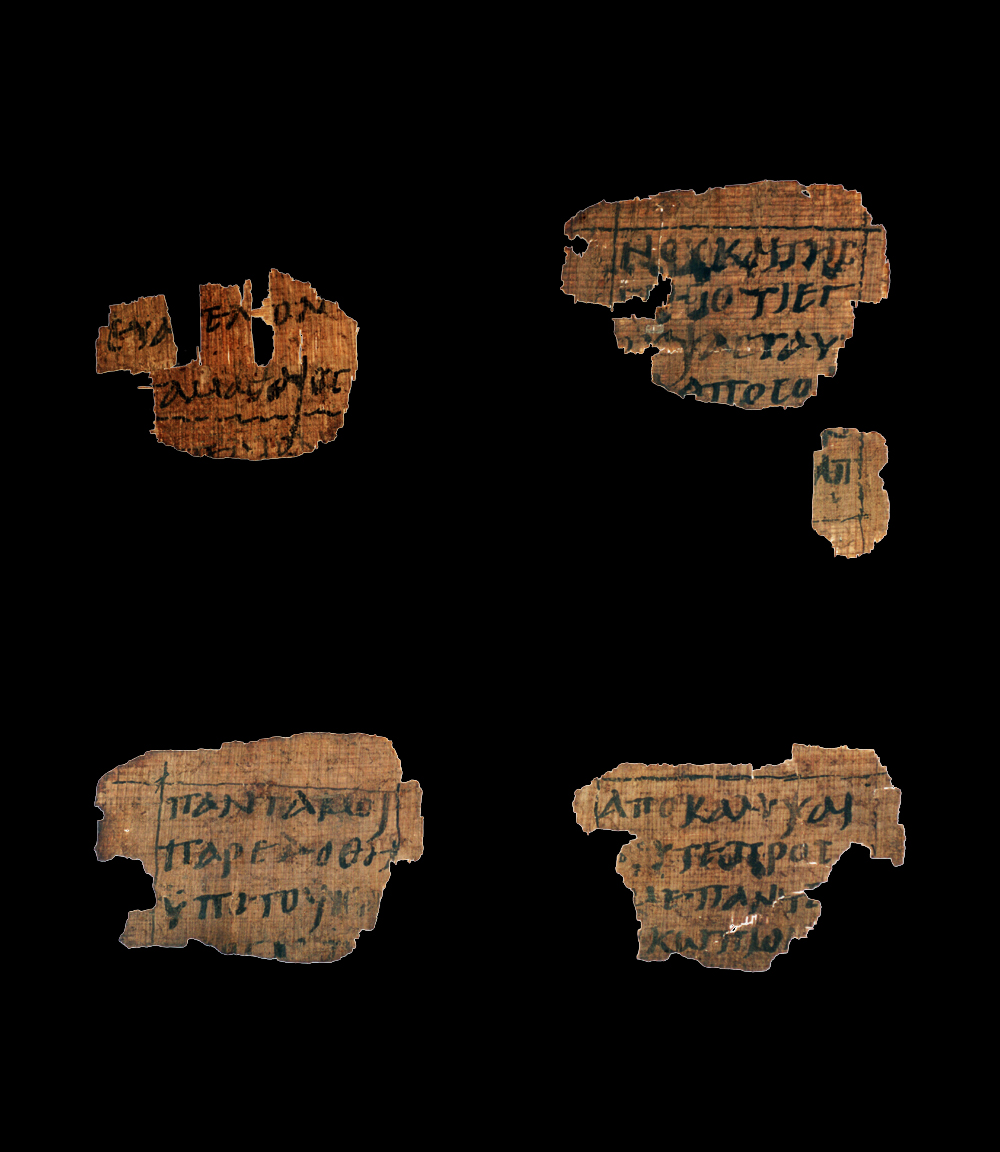
Fragments 2, 4, 6, 8 verso, Matthew 11:25–27

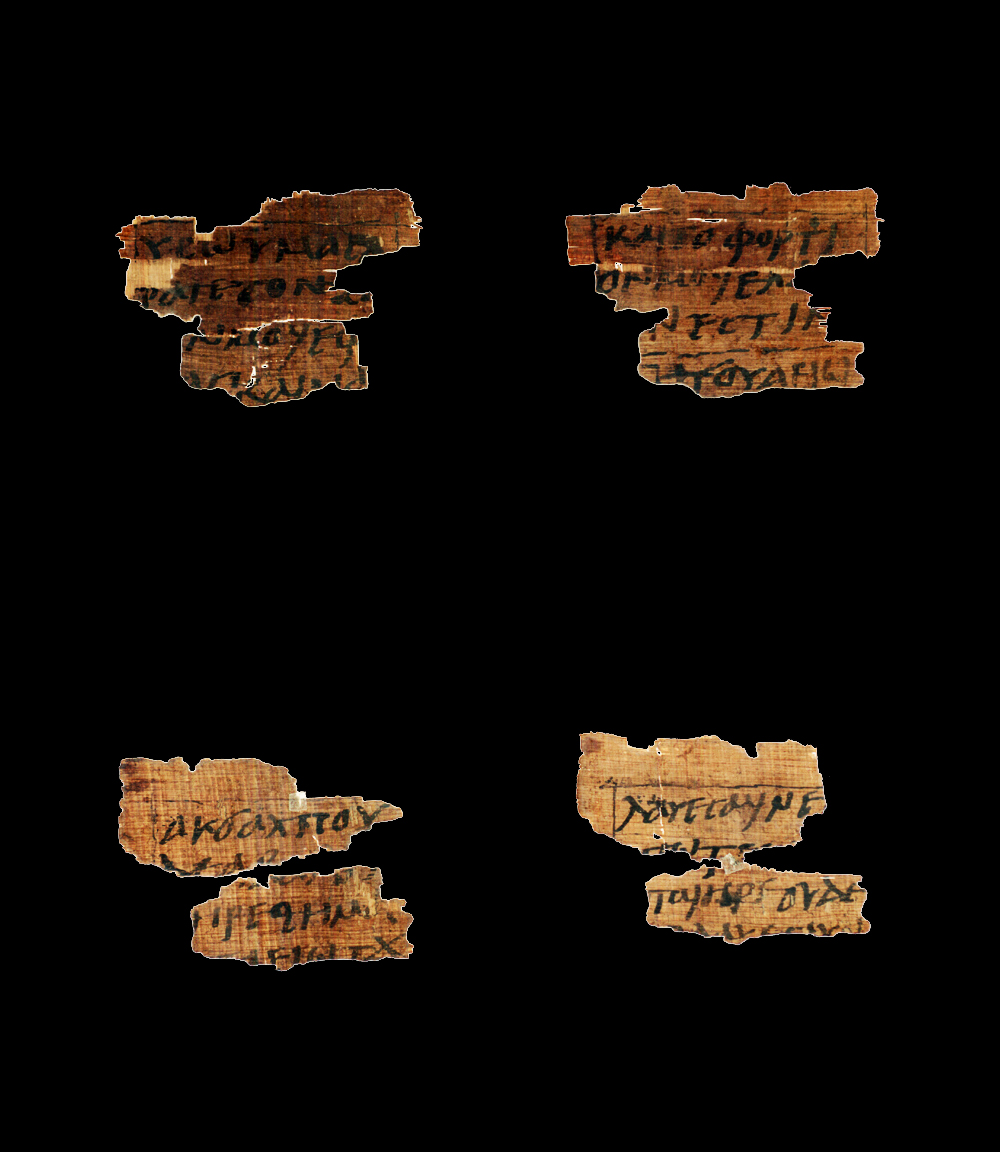
Fragments 9, 11, 13, 15 recto, Matthew 11:28–30

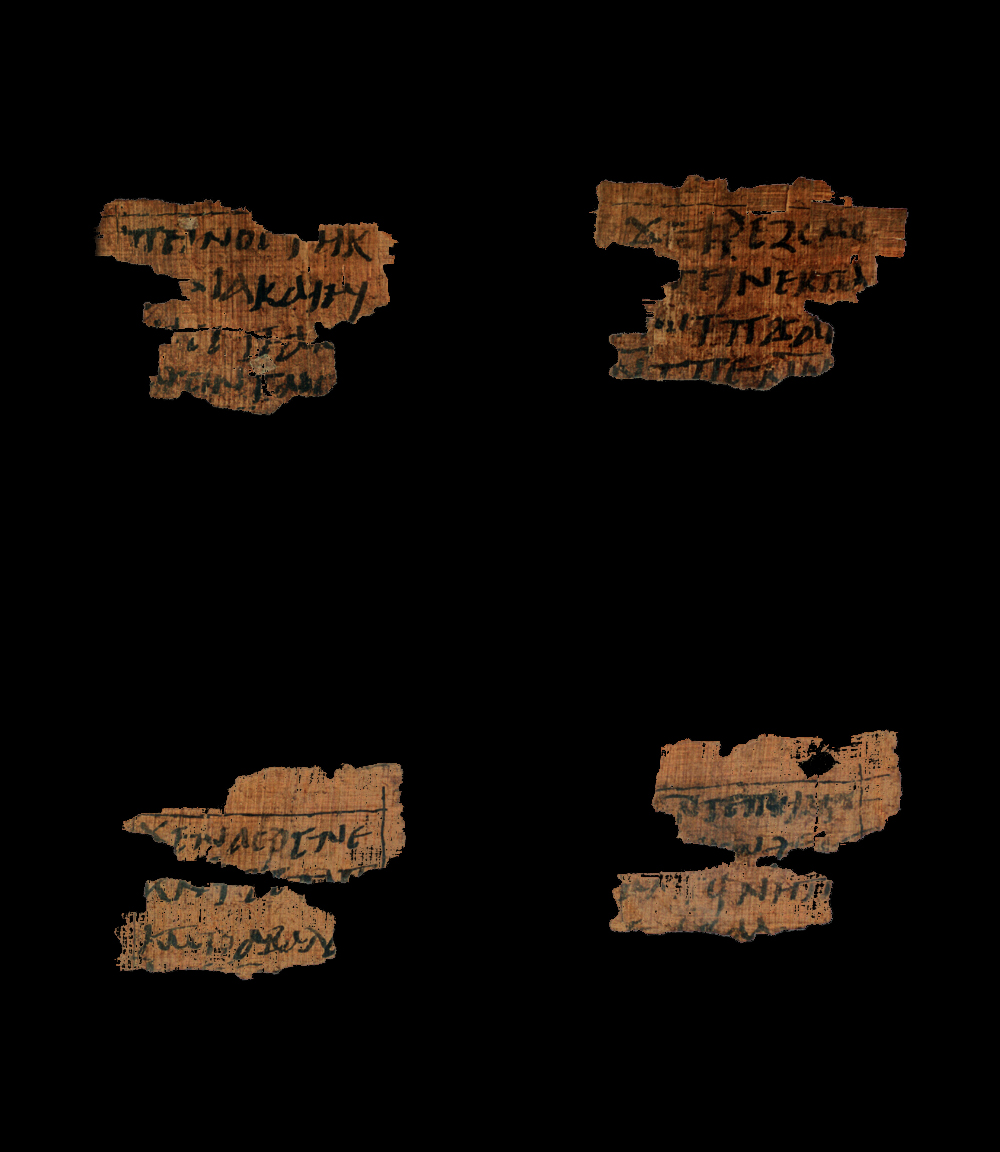
Fragments 10, 12, 14, 16 verso, Matthew 11:28–30

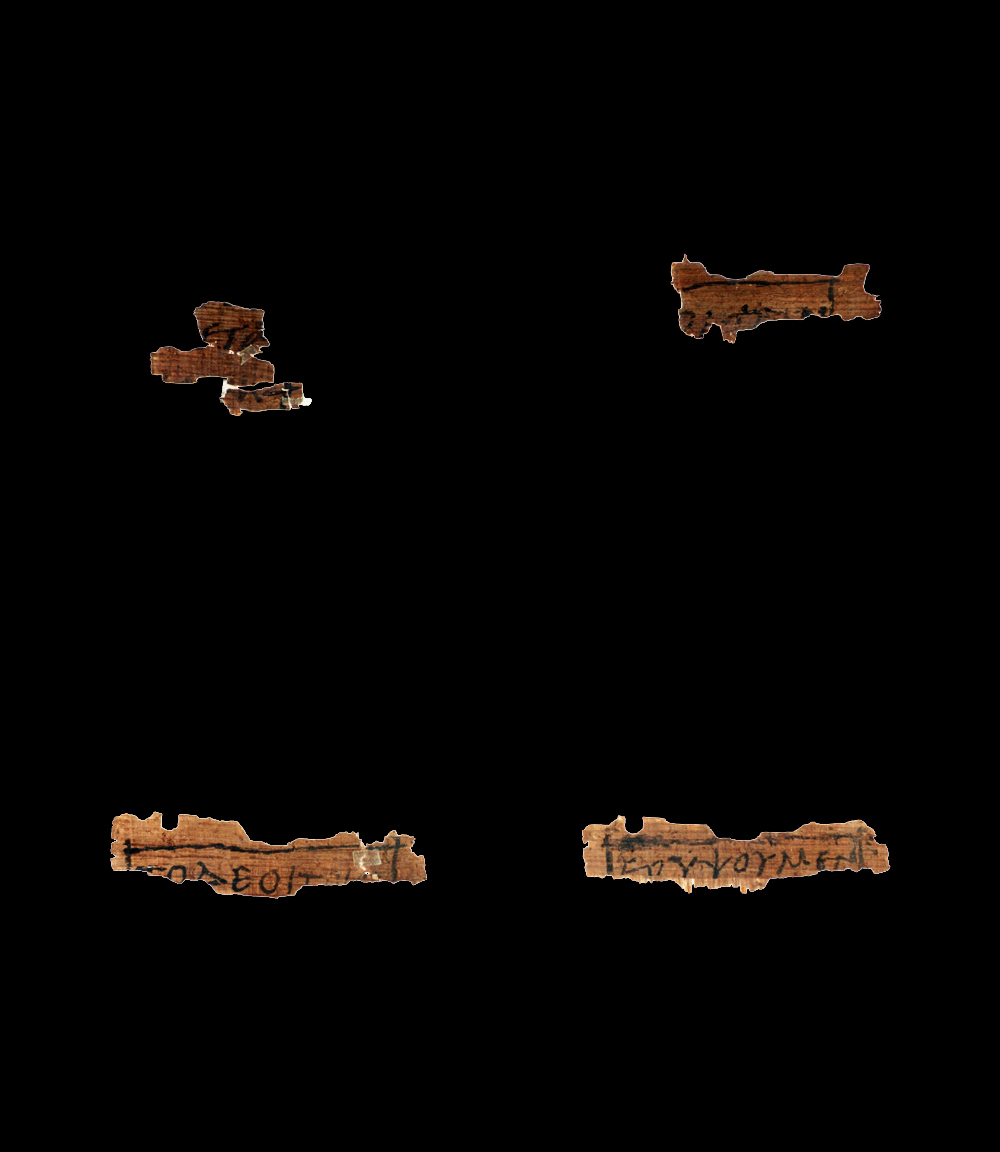
Fragments 18, 20, 22, 24 recto

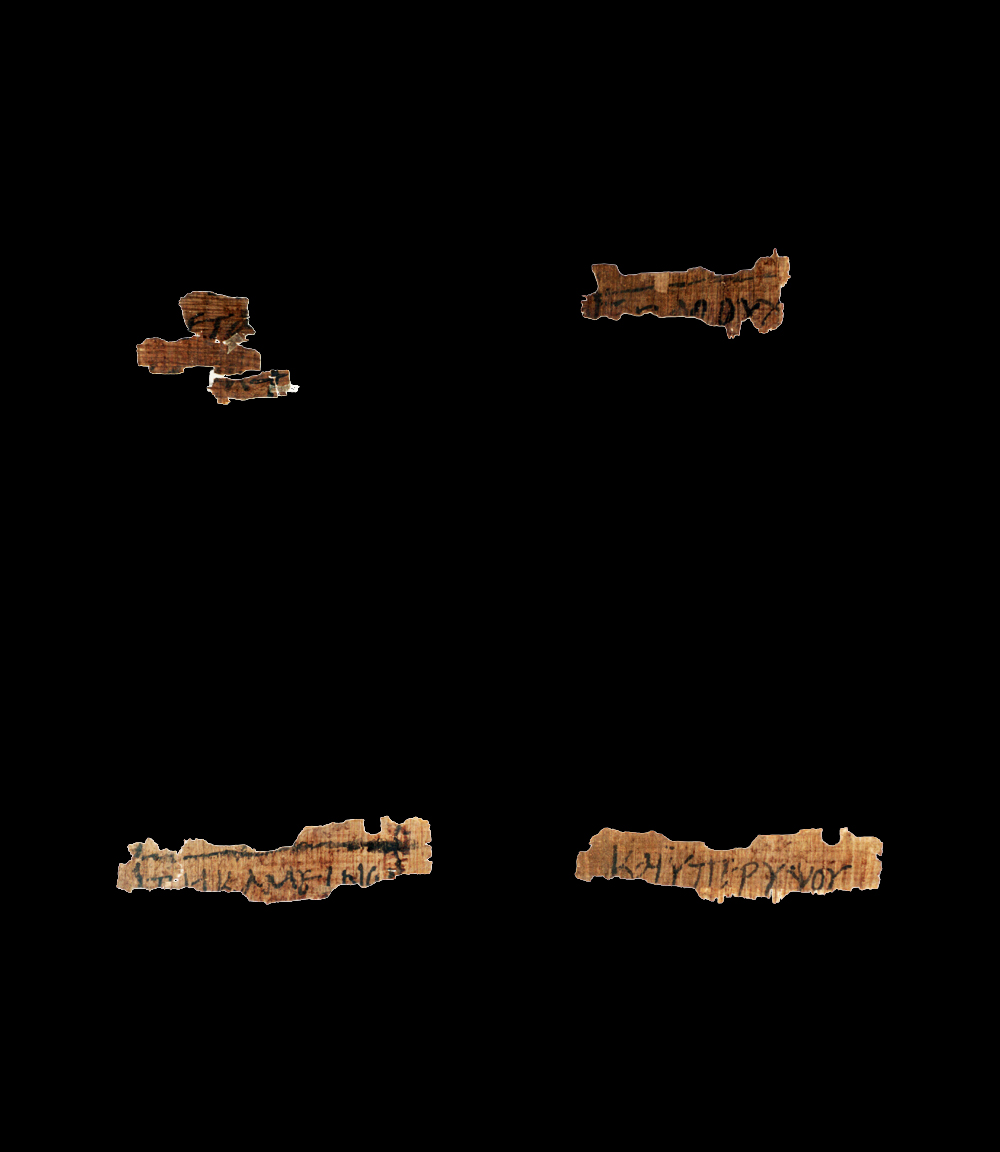
Fragments 18, 20, 22, 24 verso

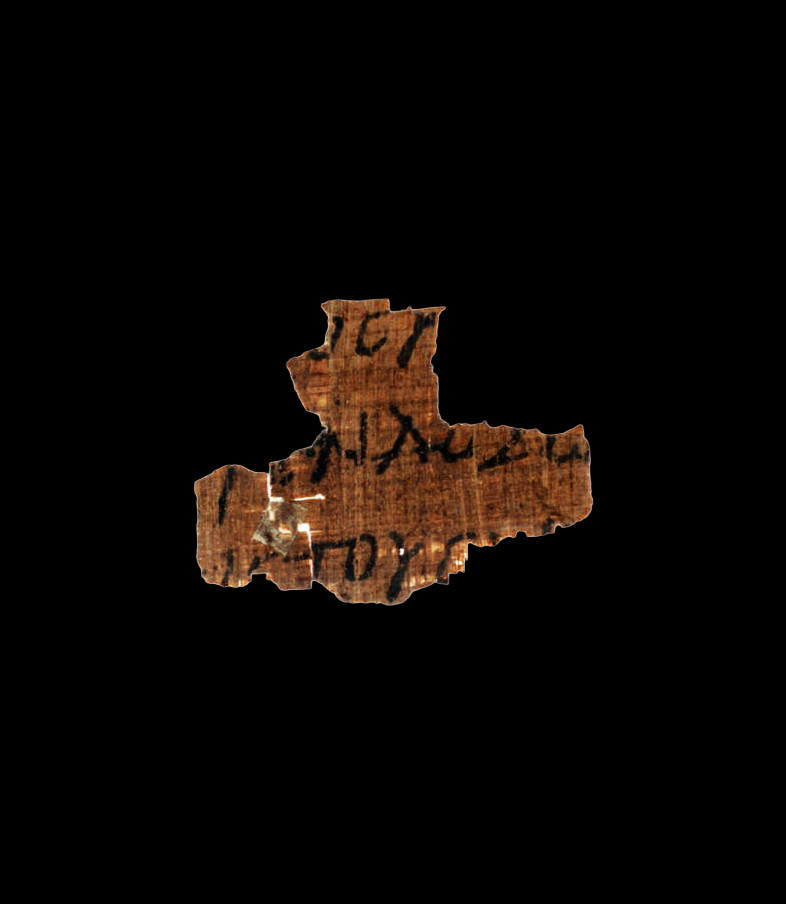
Fragment 25 recto

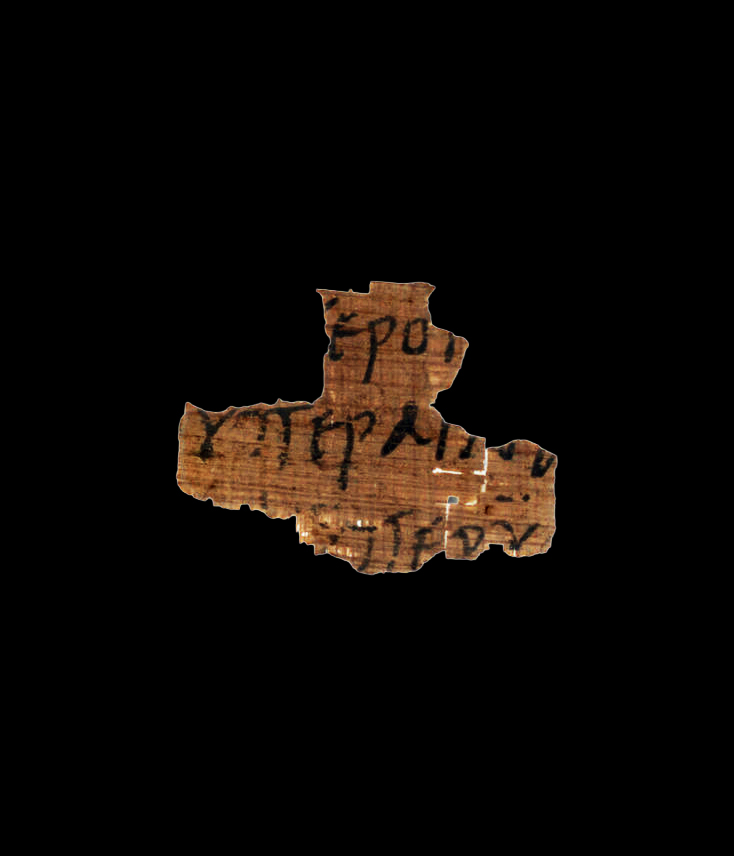
Fragment 26 verso

== See also ==
- Daniel 3
- List of New Testament papyri
- Matthew 11
