= Matthew 11:17 =

- ← 11:16 11:18 →
- Book: Gospel of Matthew
- Christian Bible part: New Testament

Matthew 11:17 is the seventeenth verse in the eleventh chapter of the Gospel of Matthew in the New Testament.

== Content ==
In the original Greek according to Westcott-Hort for this verse is:

καὶ λέγουσιν, Ηὐλήσαμεν ὑμῖν, καὶ οὐκ ὠρχήσασθε· ἐθρηνήσαμεν ὑμῖν, καὶ οὐκ ἐκόψασθε.

In the King James Version of the Bible the text reads:

And saying, We have piped unto you, and ye have not danced; we have mourned unto you, and ye have not lamented.

The New International Version translates the passage as:

"'We played the flute for you, and you did not dance; we sang a dirge and you did not mourn.'

== Analysis ==
Witham states that Christ here is represented by the children that piped, while St. John by those that mourned, since Christ did not refuse to eat and converse with sinners.

== Commentary from the Church Fathers ==
Saint Remigius: " And straightway He answers Himself, saying, It is like unto children sitting in the market-place, crying unto their fellows, and saying, We have played music to you, and ye have not danced; we have mourned, and ye have not lamented."

Hilary of Poitiers: " By the children are meant the Prophets, who preached as children in singleness of meaning, and in the midst of the synagogue, that is in the market-place, reprove them, that when they played to those to whom they had devoted the service of their body, they had not obeyed their words, as the movement of the dancers are regulated by the measures of the music. For the Prophets invited them to make confession by song to God, as it is contained in the song of Moses, of Isaiah, or of David."

Jerome: " They say therefore, We have flayed music to you, and ye have not danced; i. e. We have called on you to work good works to our songs, and ye would not. We have lamented and called you to repentance, and this ye would not, rejecting both preaching, as well of exhortation to virtue, as of repentance for sin."

Saint Remigius: " What is that He says, To their fellows? Were the unbelieving Jews then fellows of the Prophets? He speaks thus only because they were sprung of one stock."

Jerome: " The children are they of whom Isaiah speaks, Behold I, and the children whom the Lord has given me. (Is. 8:18) These children then sit in the market-place, where are many things for sale, and say,"

Chrysostom: " We have played music to you, and ye have not danced; that is, I have showed you an unrestricted life, and ye are not convinced; We have mourned unto you, and ye have not lamented; that is, John lived a hard life, and ye heeded him not. Yet does not he speak one thing, and I another, but both speak the same thing, because both have one and the same object. For John came neither eating nor drinking, and they say, He hath a dæmon. The Son of man came &c."

== See also ==
- Weddings and Funerals

Preceded by Matthew 11:16	Gospel of Matthew; Chapter 11	Succeeded by Matthew 11:18
