= Blind man of Bethsaida =

Miracle carried out by Jesus according to the Bible

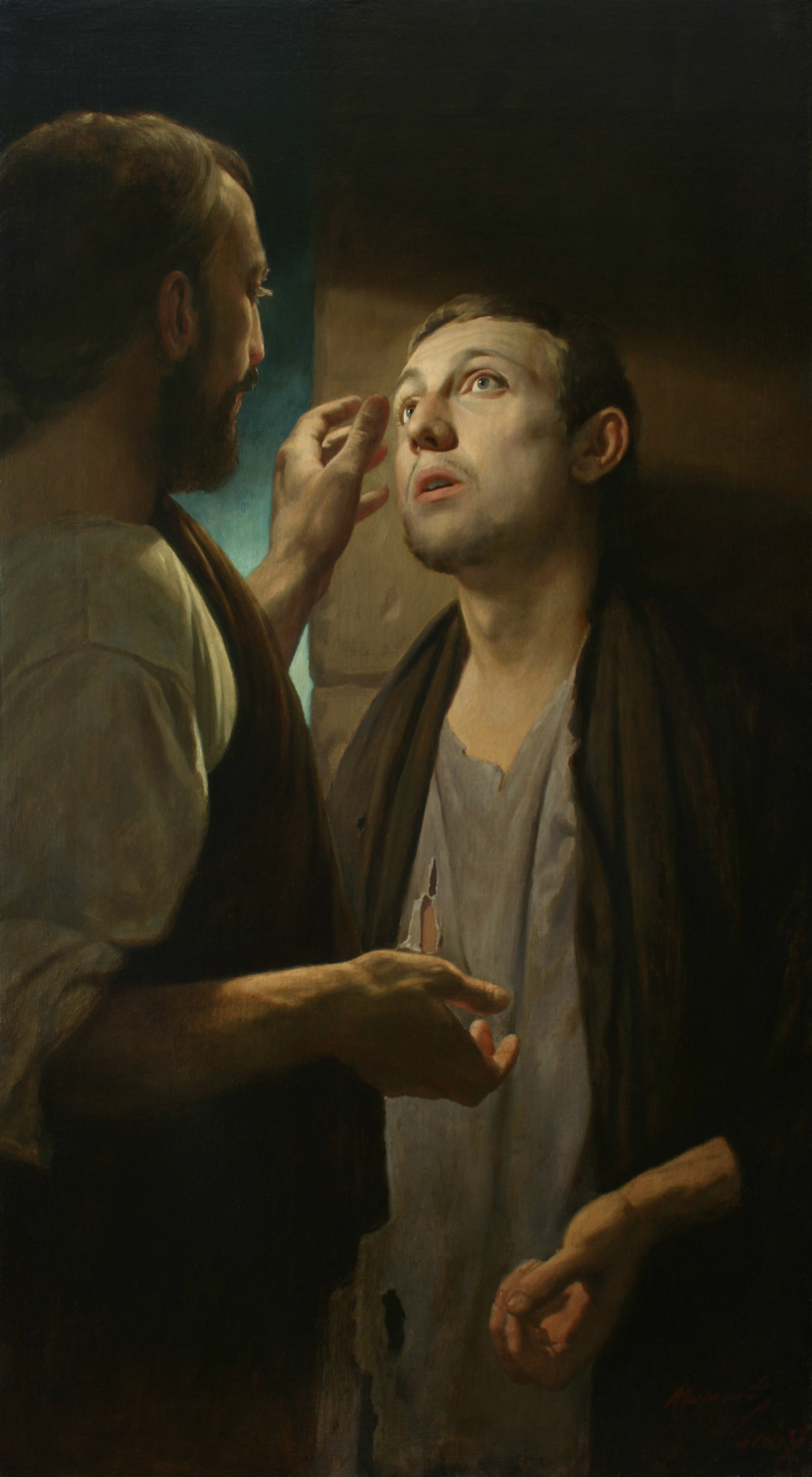
Christ Healing the Blind Man by A. Mironov

The Blind Man of Bethsaida is the subject of one of the miracles of Jesus in the Gospels. It is found only in Mark 8:22–26. The exact location of Bethsaida in this pericope is subject to debate among scholars but is likely to have been Bethsaida Julias, on the north shore of Lake Galilee.

== Mark's narrative ==
According to Mark's account, when Jesus came to Bethsaida, a town in Galilee, he was asked to heal a blind man. Jesus took the man by the hand and led him out of the town, put some spittle on his eyes, and laid hands on him. "I see men like trees, walking", said the man. Jesus repeated the procedure, resulting in clear and perfect eyesight. "Neither go into the town", commanded Jesus, "nor tell anyone in the town." (Note: The words μηδε ειπης τινι εν τη κωμη, nor tell anyone in the town, do not appear in some versions. The Vulgate and its English translations instead read "if thou enter into the town, tell nobody".)

== Claim of authenticity for the narrative ==
Even though the story is found only in Mark, some claim that its authenticity is supported by the criterion of embarrassment, arguing that early Christians would not have been happy that Jesus's first attempt at the miracle seems to fail. Another interpretation is given by Bede, who argues that "by this miracle, Christ teaches us how great is the spiritual blindness of man, which only by degrees, and by successive stages, can come to the light of Divine knowledge".

== Other mentions of miracles in Bethsaida in canonical Gospels ==
The New Testament describes only one other miracle performed in Bethsaida, the feeding of the multitude in Luke 9:16, although John 21:25 states that many more things were done by Jesus than have been recorded.

== Narrative of Jesus cursing Bethsaida ==
According to Matthew 11:21, Jesus cursed the city for its lack of belief in him despite "the mighty works done in you".

== See also ==
- Life of Jesus in the New Testament
- Ministry of Jesus
- Parables of Jesus
- Exorcising the blind and mute man
- Healing the blind near Jericho [blind Bartimaeus]
- Healing the man blind from birth
- Healing the two blind men in Galilee

== Notes ==
Blind man of Bethsaida Life of Jesus: Miracles
Preceded by Walking on Water; Miracles of Jesus	New Testament; Events	Succeeded by Peter's Confession of Christ; Ministry of Jesus
