= Matthew 11:19 =

- ← 11:18 11:20 →
- Book: Gospel of Matthew
- Christian Bible part: New Testament

Matthew 11:19 is the nineteenth verse in the eleventh chapter of the Gospel of Matthew in the New Testament.

== Content ==
In the original Greek according to Westcott-Hort for this verse is:

Ἦλθεν ὁ υἱὸς τοῦ ἀνθρώπου ἐσθίων καὶ πίνων, καὶ λέγουσιν, Ἰδού, ἄνθρωπος φάγος καὶ οἰνοπότης, τελωνῶν φίλος καὶ ἁμαρτωλῶν. Καὶ ἐδικαιώθη ἡ σοφία ἀπὸ τῶν τέκνων αὐτῆς.

In the King James Version of the Bible the text reads:

The Son of man came eating and drinking, and they say, Behold a man gluttonous, and a winebibber, a friend of publicans and sinners. But wisdom is justified of her children.

The New International Version translates the passage as:

The Son of Man came eating and drinking, and they say, 'Here is a glutton and a drunkard, a friend of tax collectors and "sinners."' But wisdom is proved right by her actions."

== Analysis ==
The accusation seems to be that unlike the austere John the Baptist, Christ lived like ordinary people, conversing with them. Lapide gives a couple of possible reasons for this, 1) "that His affability might allure those whom John’s austerity would terrify," 2) that Christ leave an example in everything, food, drink, clothing, etc., that it is not the things themselves, but an excessive love of using them, which is at fault, thus giving an example to the rich how they "might live religiously in their riches, and be saved."

== Commentary from the Church Fathers ==
Augustine: "I would that the Manichæans would tell me what Christ ate and drank, who here speaks of Himself as eating and drinking in comparison of John, who did neither. Not indeed that John drank nothing at all, but that he drank neither wine nor strong drink—but water only. Not that he dispensed altogether with food, but that he ate only locusts and wild honey. Whence then is it said of him that he came neither eating nor drinking, except that he used not that food which the Jews used? Unless therefore the Lord had used this food, He would not have been said to have been, in comparison of John, eating and drinking. It would be strange that he who ate locusts and honey, should be said to come neither eating nor drinking, and that he who ate only bread and herbs, should be said to come eating and drinking."

Chrysostom: " He says therefore, Jesus came, as much as to say, I and John came opposite ways, to do the same thing; as two hunters chasing the same animal from opposite sides, so that it might fall into the hands of one of them. But all mankind admire fasting and severity of life; and for this reason it was ordained from his infancy that John should be so brought up, that the things that he should say should receive credit. The Lord also walked in this way when He fasted forty days; but He had other means of teaching men to have confidence in Him; for it was a much greater thing that John who had walked in this way should bear witness to Him, than that He Himself should walk in that way. Again, John had nothing to show besides his life, and his righteousness; whereas Christ had also the witness of His miracles. Leaving therefore to John the representation of fasting, He Himself walked in a contrary way, entering to the table of the publicans, and eating and drinking with them."

Jerome: " If fasting then pleases you, why were you not satisfied with John? If fulness, why not with the Son of man? Yet one of these ye said had a dæmon, the other ye called a gluttonous man, and drunkard."

Chrysostom: " What excuse then shall be given for them? Therefore He adds, And wisdom is justified of her children; that is, though ye were not convinced, yet have ye nothing whereof to accuse me, as also of the Father the Prophet speaks, That thou mightest be justified in thy sayings. (Ps. 51:4.) For though nought be effected in you by that goodness which is extended to you, yet He fulfils all His part that you may not have the shadow of excuse for your ungrateful doubt."

Jerome: " Wisdom is justified of her children, i. e. The dispensation or doctrine of God, or Christ Himself who is the power and wisdom of God, is proved by the Apostles, who are His children, to have done righteously."

Hilary of Poitiers: " He is wisdom itself not by His acts, but by His nature. Many indeed evade that saying of the Apostle’s, Christ is the wisdom and power of God, (1 Cor. 1:24) by saying, that truly in creating Him of a Virgin the Wisdom and Power of God were shown mightily. Therefore that this might not be so explained, He calls Himself the Wisdom of God, showing that it was verily He, and not the deeds relating to Him, of whom this was meant. For the power itself, and the effect of that power, are not the same thing; the efficient is known from the act."

Augustine: "Or, Wisdom is justified of her children, because the holy Apostles understood that the kingdom of God was not in meat and drink, but in patient enduring; such persons neither does abundance lift up, nor want cast down, but as Paul spoke, I know how to abound, and to suffer want. (Phil. 4:12)"

Jerome: " Some copies read, Wisdom is justified of her works, for wisdom does not seek the witness of words, but of works."

Chrysostom: " You should not be surprised at His using trite instances, such as that respecting the children; for He spoke to the weakness of His hearers; as Ezekiel spoke many things adapted to the Jews, but unworthy of the greatness of God."

Hilary of Poitiers: " Mystically; Neither did the preaching of John bend the Jews, to whom the law seemed burdensome in prescribing meats and drinks, difficult and grievous, having in it sin which He calls having a dæmon—for from the difficulty of keeping it they must sin under the Law. Nor again did the preaching of the Gospel with freedom of life in Christ please them—by which the hardships and burdens of the Law were remitted, and publicans and sinners only believed in it. Thus, then, so many and so great warnings of all kinds having been offered them in vain, they are neither justified by the Law, and they are cast off from grace; Wisdom, therefore, is justified of her children, by those, that is, who seize the kingdom of heaven by the justification of faith, confessing the work of wisdom to be just, that it has transferred its gift from the rebellious to the faithful."

Preceded by Matthew 11:18	Gospel of Matthew; Chapter 11	Succeeded by Matthew 11:20
