= Matthew 11:21 =

- ← 11:20 11:22 →
- Book: Gospel of Matthew
- Christian Bible part: New Testament

Matthew 11:21 is the 21st verse in the eleventh chapter of the Gospel of Matthew in the New Testament.

== Content ==
In the original Greek according to Westcott-Hort for this verse is:

Οὐαί σοι, Χοραζίν, οὐαί σοι, Βηθσαϊδάν, ὅτι εἰ ἐν Τύρῳ καὶ Σιδῶνι ἐγένοντο αἱ δυνάμεις αἱ γενόμεναι ἐν ὑμῖν, πάλαι ἂν ἐν σάκκῳ καὶ σποδῷ μετενόησαν.

In the King James Version of the Bible the text reads:

Woe unto thee, Chorazin! woe unto thee, Bethsaida! for if the mighty works, which were done in you, had been done in Tyre and Sidon, they would have repented long ago in sackcloth and ashes.

The New International Version translates the passage as:

"Woe to you, Korazin! Woe to you, Bethsaida! If the miracles that were performed in you had been performed in Tyre and Sidon, they would have repented long ago in sackcloth and ashes.

== Analysis ==
According to Lapide Chorazin was said to have been a famous and important city of Galilee, while Bethsaida was a fishing town, where Christ healed Peter's mother in law, along with the sight of a blind man (Mark 8). Thus the cities should have been more receptive.

== Commentary from the Church Fathers ==
Jerome: " His upbraiding of the towns of Corozaim, Bethsaida, and Capharnaum, is set forth in this chapter, because He therefore upbraided them, because after He had such mighty works and wonders in them they had not done penitence. Whence He adds, Wo for thee, Corozaim! wo for thee, Bethsaida!"

Chrysostom: " That you should not say that they were by nature evil, He names Bethsaida, a town from which the Apostles had come, namely, Philip, and two pair of the chief of the Apostles, Peter and Andrew, James and John."

Jerome: " In this word Wo, these towns of Galilee are mourned for by the Saviour, that after so many signs and mighty works, they had not done penitence."

Rabanus Maurus: " Corozaim, which is interpreted ‘my mystery,’ and Bethsaida, ‘the house of fruits’ or, ‘the house of hunters,’ are towns of Galilee situated on the shore of the sea of Galilee. The Lord therefore mourns for towns which once had the mystery of God, and which ought to have brought forth the fruit of virtues, and into which spiritual hunters had been sent."

Preceded by Matthew 11:20	Gospel of Matthew; Chapter 11	Succeeded by Matthew 11:22
