= Matthew 11:24 =

- ← 11:23 11:25 →
- Book: Gospel of Matthew
- Christian Bible part: New Testament

Matthew 11:24 is the 24th verse in the eleventh chapter of the Gospel of Matthew in the New Testament.

== Content ==
In the original Greek according to Westcott-Hort for this verse is:

Πλὴν λέγω ὑμῖν ὅτι γῇ Σοδόμων ἀνεκτότερον ἔσται ἐν ἡμέρᾳ κρίσεως, ἢ σοί.

In the King James Version of the Bible the text reads:

But I say unto you, That it shall be more tolerable for the land of Sodom in the day of judgment, than for thee.

The New International Version translates the passage as:

But I tell you that it will be more bearable for Sodom on the day of judgment than for you."

== Analysis ==
Other languages render "more tolerable" quite differently: 1) Arabic, it shall find greater forgiveness, 2) Syriac, they shall be more tranquil.

== Commentary from the Church Fathers ==
Saint Remigius: " And they have made the sins not of Sodom only and Gomorrah, but of Tyre and Sidon light in comparison, and therefore it follows, For if the mighty works which have been done in thee had been done in Sodom, it would perhaps have remained unto this day."

Chrysostom: " This makes the accusation heavier, for it is a proof of extreme wickedness, that they are worse, not only than any then living, but than the wickedest of all past time."

Jerome: " In Capharnaum, which is interpreted ‘the most fair town,’ Jerusalem is condemned, to which it is said by Ezekiel, Sodom is justified by thee. (Ezek. 16:52)"

Saint Remigius: " The Lord, who knows all things, here uses a word expressing uncertainty—perhaps, to show that freedom of choice is left to men. But I say unto you, it shall be easier for the land of Sodom in the day of judgment than for you. And be it known, that in speaking of the city or country, the Lord does not chide with the buildings and walls, but with the men that inhabit there, by the figure metonymy, putting the thing containing for the thing contained. The words, It shall be easier in the day of judgment, clearly prove that there are divers punishments in hell, as there are divers mansions in the kingdom of heaven."

Jerome: " The careful reader will hesitate here; If Tyre and Sidon could have done penitence at the preaching of the Saviour, and His miracles, they are not in fault that they believed not; the sin is his who would not preach to bring them to penitence. To this there is a ready answer, that we know not God's judgments, and are ignorant of the sacraments of His peculiar dispensations. It was determined by the Lord not to pass the borders of Judæa, that He might not give the Pharisees and Priests a just occasion of persecuting Him, as also He gave commandment to the Apostles, Go not into the way of the Gentiles. Corozaim and Bethsaida are condemned because they would not believe, though Christ Himself was among them—Tyre and Sidon are justified, because they believed His Apostles. You should not enquire into times when you see the salvation of those that believe."

Saint Remigius: " We may also answer in another way. There were many in Corozaim and Bethsaida who would believe, and many in Tyre and Sidon who would not believe, and therefore were not worthy of the Gospel. The Lord therefore preached to the dwellers in Corozaim and Bethsaida, that they who were to believe, might be able; and preached not in Tyre and Sidon, lest perhaps they who were not to believe, being made worse by contempt of the Gospel, should be punished more heavily."

Augustine: "A certain Catholic disputant of some note expounded this place of the Gospel in the following way; That the Lord foreknew that they of Tyre and Sidon would fall from the faith after they had believed the miracles done among them; and that therefore in mercy He did not His miracles there; because they would have incurred the heavier penalty had they lapsed from the faith after having held it, than if they had never held it at all. Or otherwise, The Lord surely foreknew His mercies with which He deigns to deliver us. And this is the predestination of the saints, namely, the foreknowledge and making ready the mercies of God, by which they are most certainly saved, whosoever are saved. The rest are left to the just judgment of God in the general body of the condemned, where they of Tyre and Sidon are left, who might have believed had they seen Christ's many miracles; but since it was not given them that they should believe, therefore that through which they might have believed was also withheld. From which it appears, that there are certain who have in their dispositions by nature a divine gift of understanding by which they would be moved to faith, if they should either hear words or see signs adapted to their minds. But if they be not by the high sentence of God set apart from the mass of perdition through the predestination of grace, then neither words nor works are set before them by God, which yet, could they have seen or heard them, would have stirred them to believe. In this general mass of perdition are the Jews also left, who could not believe so great and manifest wonders wrought before their eyes. And the cause wherefore they could not believe, the Gospel hath not hidden, speaking thus; Though he did so great miracles before them, yet could they not believe, as Esaias said, I have blinded their eyes, and hardened their heart. (John 12:37) Not in this way then were the eyes of they of Tyre and Sidon blinded, or their heart hardened, for they would have believed had they seen such wonders as these saw. But it profited those not that they could have believed, for that they were not predestinated; neither would it have been any hindrance to these that they had not power to believe, had they been so predestined that God should have enlightened their blindness, and taken away the heart of stone from within them."

Augustine: "Luke also gives this as spoken in continuation of some other of the Lord’s discourses; from which it appears that he has rather followed the actual order of events; Matthew to have followed his recollection. Or the words of Matthew, Then began he to upbraid the towns, must be taken, as some think, as expressing some particular time by the word then, but not referring generally to that time in which the many other things here told were done and said. Whoever, therefore, thinks thus must suppose that this was spoken twice. And when we find in the same Evangelist some things spoken by the Lord at two different times—like that in Luke concerning the not taking a scrip for their journey,—what wonder is it if any thing else, which was twice spoken, is found once severally in two several Gospels in the actual connexion in which it was spoken, which connexion is different, because they are two different occasions on which it is related to have been spoken?"

Preceded by Matthew 11:23	Gospel of Matthew; Chapter 11	Succeeded by Matthew 11:25
