= Matthew 11:25 =

- ← 11:24 11:26 →
- Book: Gospel of Matthew
- Christian Bible part: New Testament

Matthew 11:25 is the 25th verse in the eleventh chapter of the Gospel of Matthew in the New Testament.

== Content ==
In the original Greek according to Westcott-Hort, this verse is:

Ἐν ἐκείνῳ τῷ καιρῷ ἀποκριθεὶς ὁ Ἰησοῦς εἶπεν, Ἐξομολογοῦμαί σοι, πάτερ, Κύριε τοῦ οὐρανοῦ καὶ τῆς γῆς, ὅτι ἀπέκρυψας ταῦτα ἀπὸ σοφῶν καὶ συνετῶν, καὶ ἀπεκάλυψας αὐτὰ νηπίοις.

In the King James Version of the Bible the text reads:

At that time Jesus answered and said, I thank thee, O Father, Lord of heaven and earth, because thou hast hid these things from the wise and prudent, and hast revealed them unto babes.

The New International Version translates the passage as:

At that time Jesus said, "I praise you, Father, Lord of heaven and earth, because you have hidden these things from the wise and learned, and revealed them to little children".

== Analysis ==
Here we have the reason for the condemnation of the unrepentant Galilean cities in the previous verse, i.e. pride and haughtiness, since Jesus lauds the "little children". He uses the word Ἐξομολογοῦμαί (hexomologoumai), translated sometimes as "confess", a word used regularly in the psalms, e.g. "I will confess to Thee with my whole heart", and, "Confess to the Lord, for He is good." Both the New Century Version and the New International Version render it as praise. He speaks directly to God, calling God "father", "not to idolize a name or gender or metaphor, but to focus on a relationship". Here we also see Jesus referring to God's dominion over all things (i.e. heaven and earth). Irish Archbishop John McEvilly points out that God's lordship separates the proud from the humble both in heaven (separating Satan from the good angels), and on earth (separating the Apostles from the Pharisees and Scribes). The "little children" portion of this verse appears to be an allusion to Psalm 8:2(3), "Out of the mouths of babes and sucklings Thou hast perfected praise." Jesus contrasts the worldly choosing of those who are rich and intellectual, with God choosing the poor, ignorant and weak.

== Commentary from the Church Fathers ==
Glossa Ordinaria: "Because the Lord knew that many would doubt respecting the foregoing matter, namely, that the Jews would not receive Christ whom the Gentile world has so willingly received, He here makes answer to their thoughts; And Jesus answered and said, I confess unto thee, Father, Lord of heaven and earth."

Glossa Ordinaria: "That is, Who makest of heaven, or leavest in earthliness, whom Thou wilt. Or literally,"

Augustine: "If Christ, from whom all sin is far, said, I confess, confession is not proper for the sinner only, but sometimes also for him that gives thanks. We may confess either by praising God, or by accusing ourselves. When He said, I confess unto thee, it is, I praise Thee, not I accuse Myself."

Jerome: "Let those hear who falsely argue, that the Saviour was not born but created, how He calls His Father Lord of heaven and earth. For if He be a creature, and the creature can call its Maker Father, it was surely foolish here to address Him as Lord of heaven and earth, and not of Him (Christ) likewise. He gives thanks that His coming has opened to the Apostles sacraments, which the Scribes and Pharisees knew not, who seemed to themselves wise, and understanding in their own eyes; That thou hast hid these things from the wise and understanding, and hast revealed them unto babes."

Augustine: "That the wise and understanding are to be taken as the proud, Himself opens to us when He says, and hast revealed them unto babes; for who are babes but the humble?"

Gregory the Great: "He says not 'to the foolish', but to babes, showing that He condemns pride, not understanding."

Chrysostom: "Or when He says, The wise, He does not speak of true wisdom, but of that which the Scribes and Pharisees seemed to have by their speech. Wherefore He said not, ‘And hast revealed them to the foolish’, but, to babes, that is, uneducated, or simple; teaching us in all things to keep ourselves from pride, and to seek humility."

Hilary of Poitiers: "The hidden things of heavenly words and their power are hid from the wise, and revealed to the babes; babes, that is, in malice, not in understanding; hid from the wise because of their presumption of their own wisdom, not because of their wisdom."

Chrysostom: "That it is revealed to the one is matter of joy, that it is hid from the other not of joy, but of sorrow; He does not therefore joy on this account, but He joys that these have known what the wise have not known."

Hilary of Poitiers: "The justice of this the Lord confirms by the sentence of the Father's will, that they who disdain to be made babes in God, should become fools in their own wisdom; and therefore He adds, Even so, Father; for so it seemed good before thee."

Gregory the Great: "In which words we have a lesson of humility, that we should not rashly presume to discuss the counsels of heaven concerning the calling of some, and the rejection of others showing that that cannot be unrighteous which is willed by Him that is righteous."

Jerome: "In these words moreover He speaks to the Father with the desire of one petitioning, that His mercy begun in the Apostles might be completed in them."

Chrysostom: "These things which the Lord spoke to His disciples, made them more zealous. As afterwards they thought great things of themselves, because they cast out dæmons, therefore He here reproves them; for what they had, was by revelation, not by their own efforts. The Scribes who esteemed themselves wise and understanding were excluded because of them-pride, and therefore He says, Since on this account the mysteries of God were hid from them, fear ye, and abide as babes, for this it is that has made you partakers in the revelation. But as when Paul says, God gave them, over to a reprobate mind, (Romans 1:28), he does not mean that God did this, but they who gave Him cause, so here, Thou hast hid these things from the wise and understanding. And wherefore were they hid from them? Hear Paul speaking, Seeking to set up their own righteousness, they were not subject to the righteousness of God (Romans 10:3)."

Preceded by Matthew 11:24	Gospel of Matthew; Chapter 11	Succeeded by Matthew 11:26
