= Papyrus 70 =

Papyrus 𝔓^{70}
- New Testament manuscript
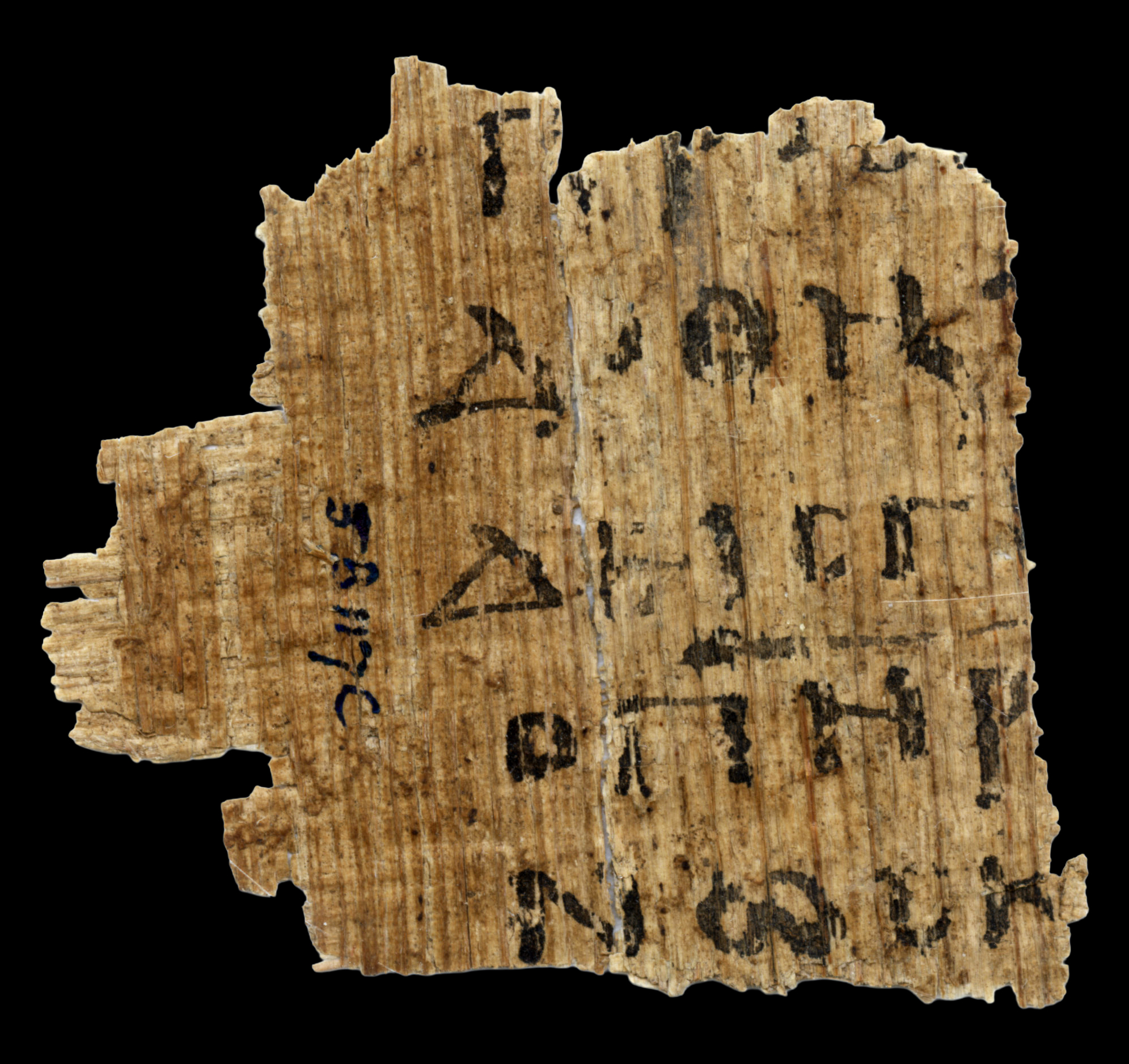
- Oxford fragment recto, Matt 11:26-27
- Name: P. Oxy. 2384
- Text: Matthew 2-3; 11; 12; 24 †
- Date: 3rd century
- Script: Greek
- Found: Egypt
- Now at: Ashmolean Museum; National Archaeological Museum (Florence)
- Cite: E. Lobel, C. H. Roberts, E. G. Turner, and J. W. B. Barns, OP XXIV (1957), pp. 4-5.
- Size: 15 x 25 cm
- Type: Alexandrian text-type
- Category: I
- Hand: carelessly written

Papyrus 70 is an early copy of the New Testament in Greek. It is a papyrus manuscript of the Gospel of Matthew. It is designated by the siglum 𝔓^{70} in the Gregory-Aland numbering of New Testament manuscripts. The surviving texts of Matthew are verses 2:13-16; 2:22-3:1; 11:26-27; 12:4-5; 24:3-6.12-15. 𝔓^{70} has a fairly reliable text, though it was carelessly written. The manuscript palaeographically had been assigned to the late 3rd century.

Text

The Greek text of this codex is considered a representative of the Alexandrian text-type. Biblical scholar Kurt Aland ascribed it as a “strict text”, and placed it in Category I of his New Testament manuscript classification system.

Present location

It is currently housed at the Ashmolean Museum (P. Oxy. 2384) in Oxford and at the Papyrological Institute of Florence in National Archaeological Museum (Florence) (PSI 3407 – formerly CNR 419, 420).

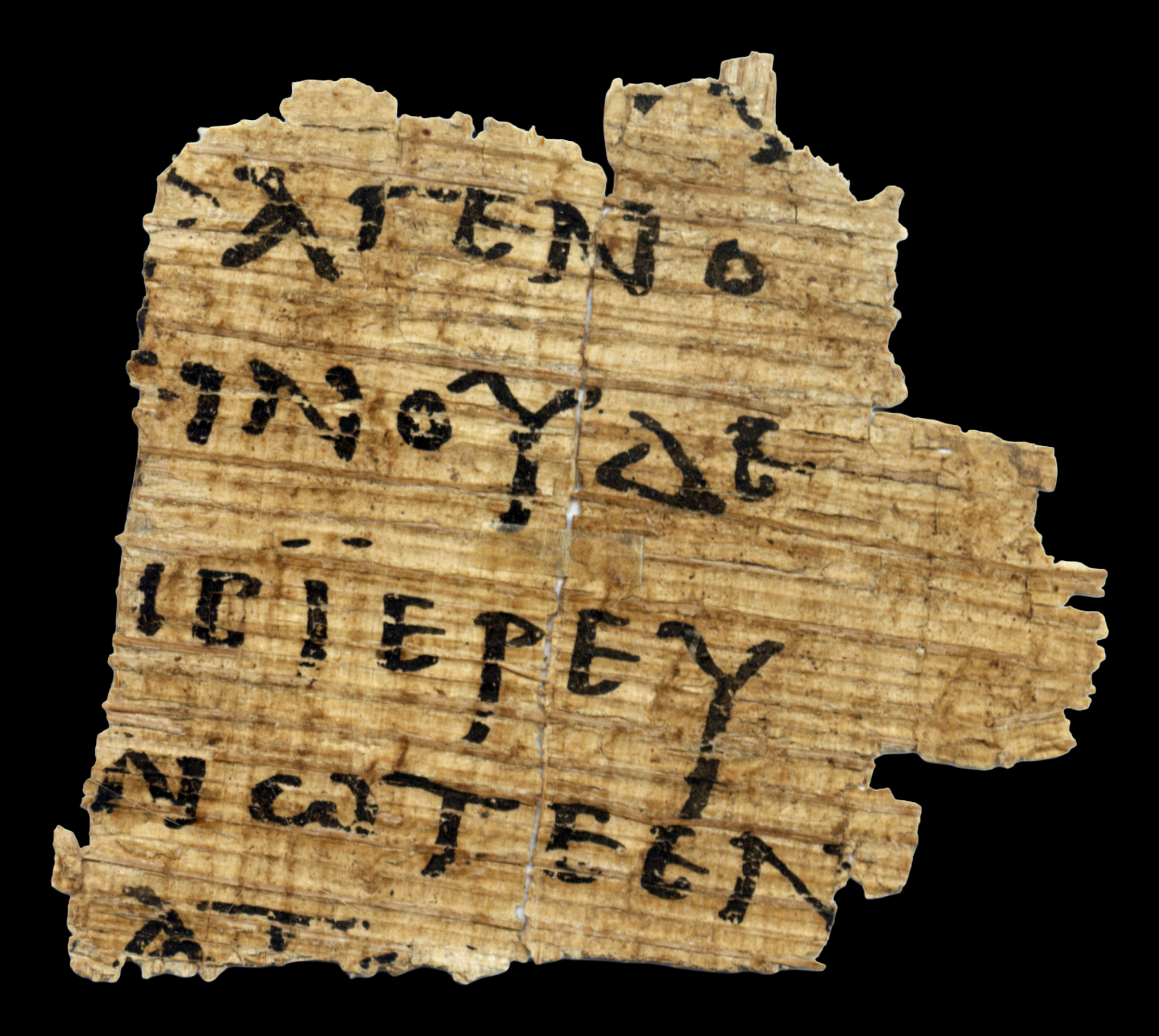
Oxford fragment verso, Matt 12:4-5

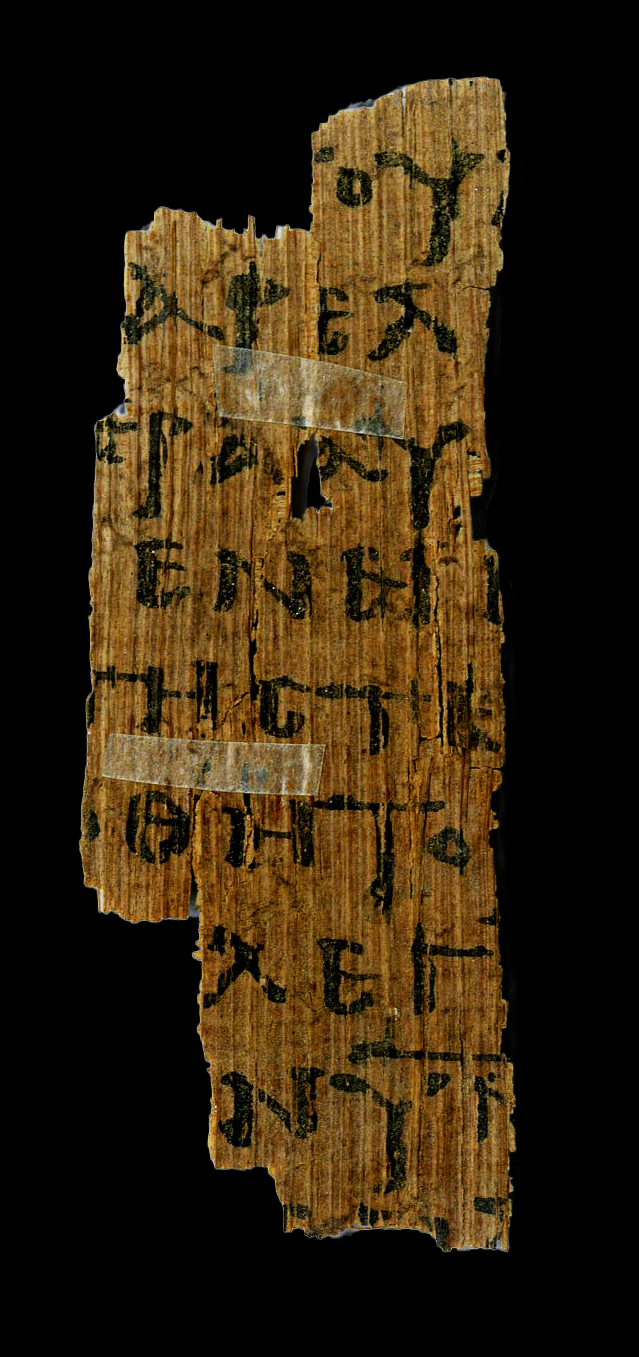
Florence fragment a recto, Matt 2:22-3:1

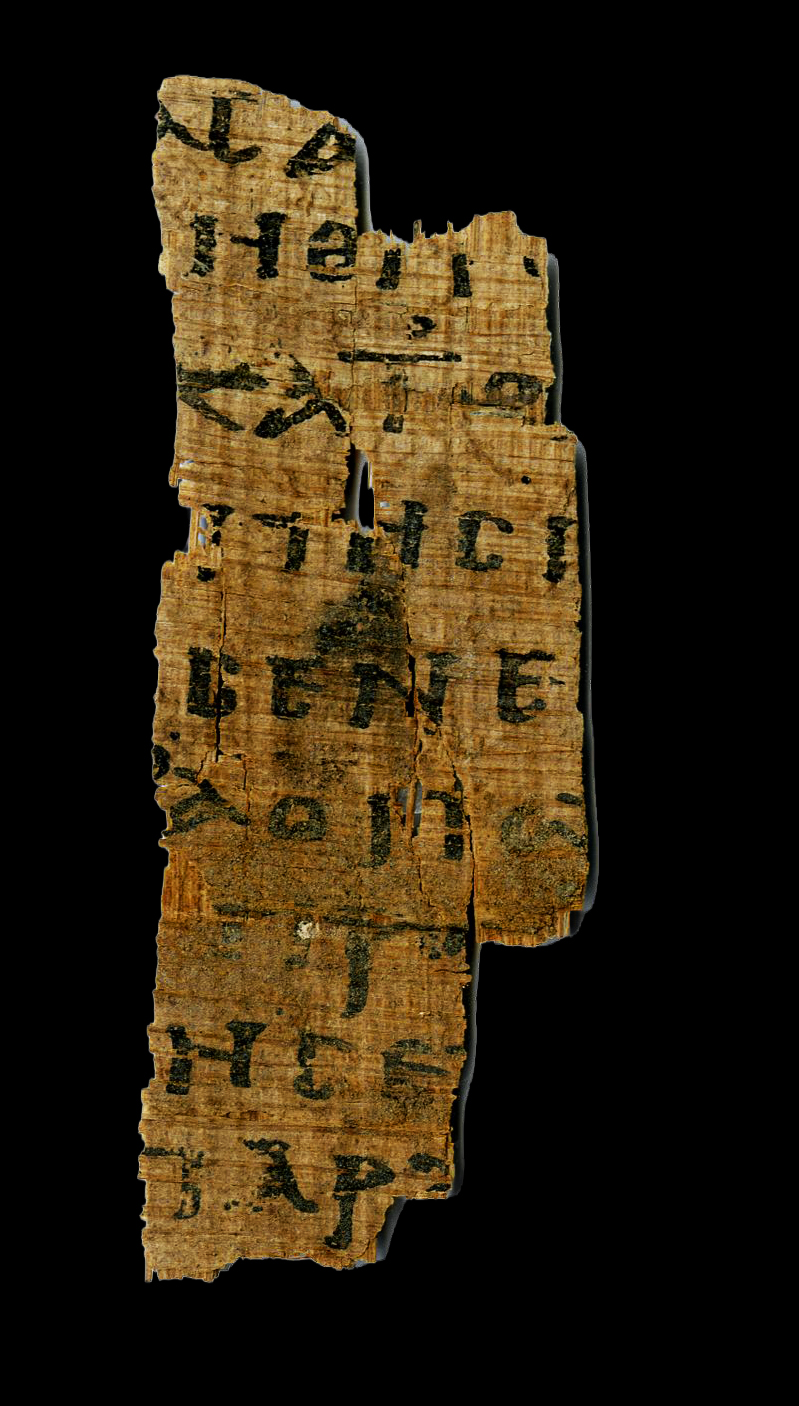
Florence fragment a verso, Matt 2:13–16

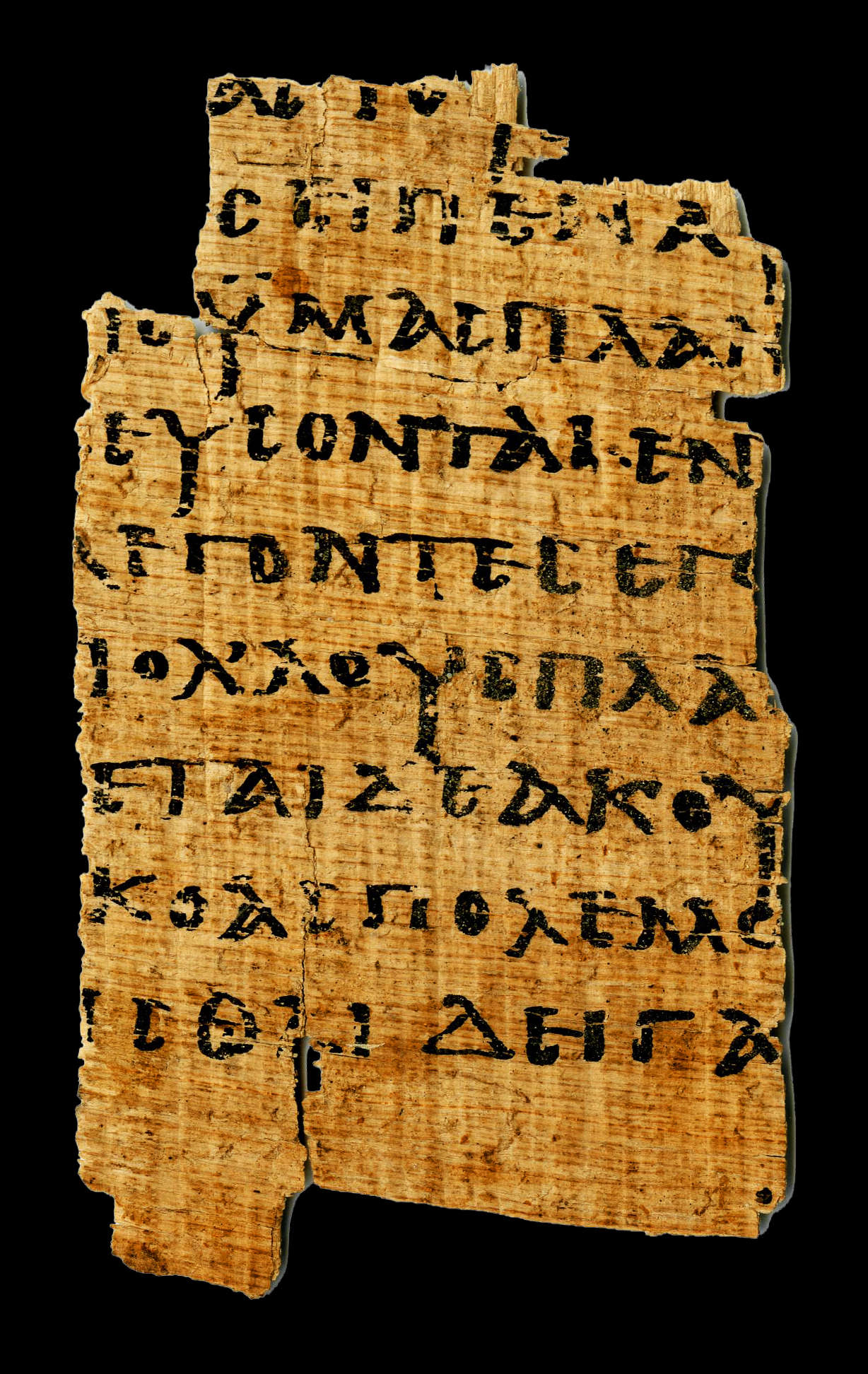
Florence fragment b recto, Matt 24:3-6

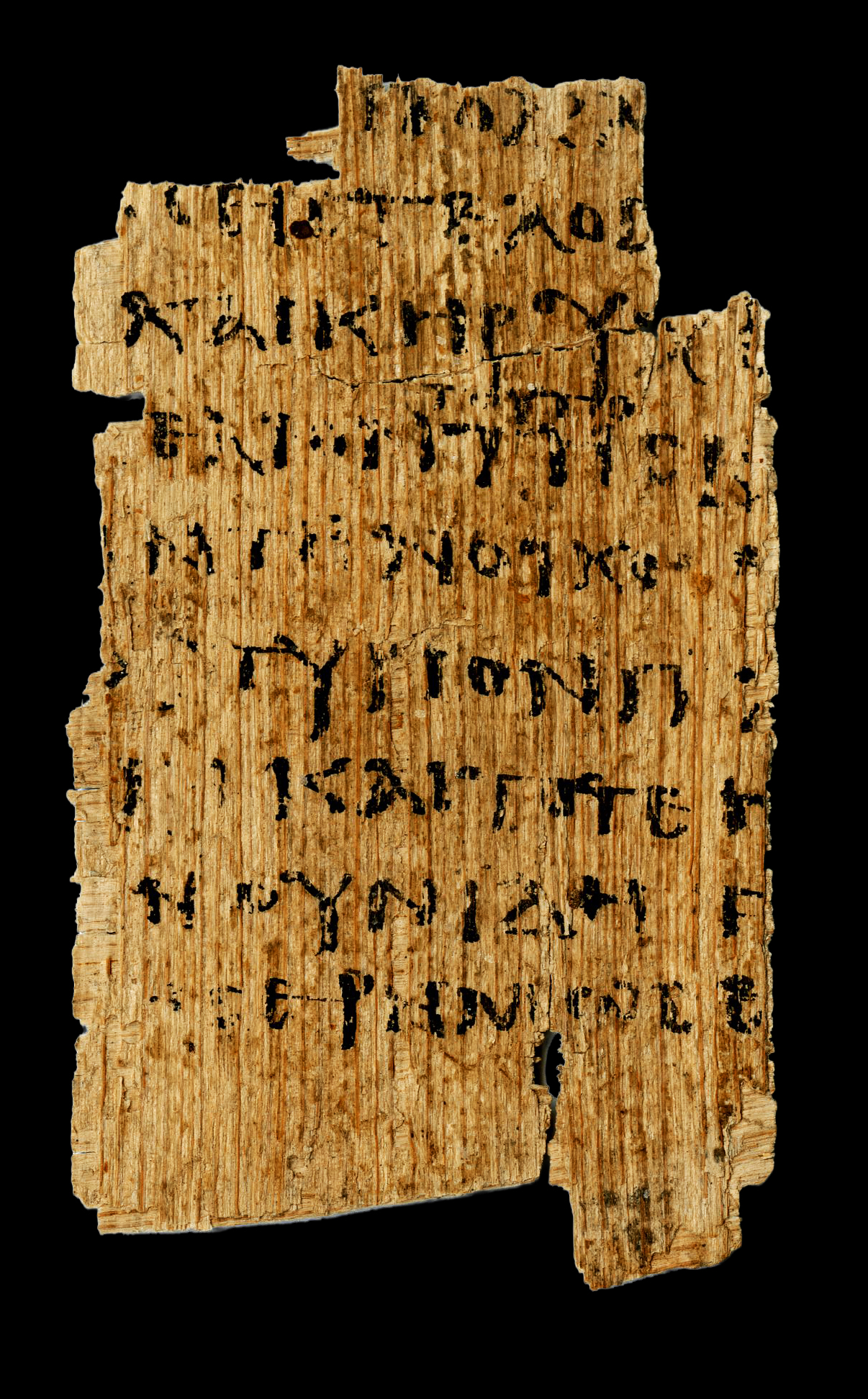
Florence fragment b verso, Matt 24:12-15.

== See also ==
- List of New Testament papyri
- Oxyrhynchus papyri

== Images ==
- High Resolution Digital images of P. Oxy. XXIV online at the University of Oxford's "P. Oxy Online"
- Digital Images of 𝔓^{107} online at the CSNTM.
