= Weddings and Funerals =

Song

"Weddings and Funerals" is a nursery rhyme or folksong and playground game.

A wedding song we played for you,

The dance you did but scorn.

A woeful dirge we chanted, too,

But then you would not mourn.

== Origin ==
The verse is based on the verses Matthew 11:17 and Luke 7:32 in the New Testament of the Christian Bible.

The exact words of this English nursery rhyme were incorporated as the translation of these verses in the International Standard Version (2008).

In context, the verse was spoken by Jesus as a reproach to those people who rejected both the austere lifestyle and preaching of John the Baptist and his own more accessible ministry.
