= Matthew 11 =

- ← chapter 10 chapter 12 →
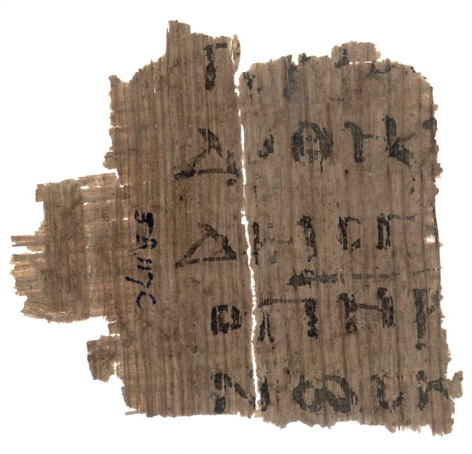
- Gospel of Matthew 11:26–27 on Papyrus 70, from 3rd century
- Book: Gospel of Matthew
- Category: Gospel
- Christian Bible part: New Testament
- Order in the Christian part: 1

Matthew 11 is the eleventh chapter in the Gospel of Matthew in the New Testament section of the Christian Bible. It continues the gospel's narrative about Jesus' ministry in Galilee.

== Text ==
The original text was written in Koine Greek. This chapter is divided into 30 verses.

=== Textual witnesses ===
Some early manuscripts containing the text of this chapter are:

- Papyrus 70 (3rd century; extant verses 26–27)
- Codex Vaticanus (325–350)
- Codex Sinaiticus (330–360; complete)
- Papyrus 62 (4th century; extant verses 25–30; also contains verses 25–29 in the Coptic language)
- Papyrus 19 (4th/5th century; extant verses 1–5)
- Codex Bezae (~400)
- Codex Washingtonianus (~400)
- Codex Ephraemi Rescriptus (~450; complete)
- Codex Purpureus Rossanensis (6th century)
- Codex Petropolitanus Purpureus (6th century; extant verses 4–30)
- Codex Sinopensis (6th century; extant verses 5–12)

== Structure ==
This chapter can be grouped (with cross references to the other gospels):

- Matthew 11:1 = Ministry of Jesus (Mark 13:9–13; Luke 21:12–19; Luke 12:2–9).

Verse 1 can be treated as a continuation of Matthew 10:34–42. Dale Allison calls this verse a "transitional sentence".

- Matthew 11:2–19 = Messengers from John the Baptist (Luke 7:18–35)
- Matthew 11:20–24 = Cursing Chorazin, Bethsaida, and Capernaum (Luke 10:13–15)
- Matthew 11:25–30 = Praising the Father (Luke 10:21–22)

The New King James Version organises this chapter as follows:

- Matthew 11:1–19 = John the Baptist Sends Messengers to Jesus
- Matthew 11:20–24 = Woe to the Impenitent Cities
- Matthew 11:25–30 = Jesus gives True Rest

== John the Baptist sends messengers to Jesus ==
Verses 2 to 6 relate to John the Baptist's enquiry about Jesus, relayed by his messengers. Verses 7 to 19 recount Jesus' assessment of John's ministry.

=== Verses 2–3 ===
^{2}Now when John had heard in the prison the works of Christ, he sent two of his disciples,
^{3}And said unto him, Art thou he that should come, or do we look for another?

Some translations use descriptive words to refer to the expected Messiah: "the one who is to come" (English Standard Version, New Heart English Bible), or "the one we are waiting for" (Living Bible), whereas other translations render the Greek: ο ερχομενος (ho erchomenos) as a title: "the Expected One" (New American Standard Bible), or "the Coming One" (Weymouth New Testament, New King James Version).

== Verses 20–24 ==
Having set out in verse 1 "to teach and to preach in their cities", verses 20–24 give an account of Jesus' condemnation of the cities of Galilee for their refusal to repent. Jesus worked most of his miracles or "deeds of power" in these cities.

== True rest ==
=== Verse 25 ===
At that time, Jesus answered and said, “I thank You, Father, Lord of heaven and earth, that You have hidden these things from the wise and prudent and have revealed them to babes.

German Protestant theologian Karl Theodor Keim called this text a "pearl of the sayings of Jesus". Pope Francis has noted with support that Pope Benedict XVI "often pointed out that the theologian must remain attentive to the faith lived by the humble and the small, to whom it pleased the Father to reveal that which He had hidden from the learned and the wise”.

=== Verse 27 ===
All things have been delivered to Me by My Father, and no one knows the Son except the Father. Nor does anyone know the Father except the Son, and the one to whom the Son wills to reveal Him.

The Jerusalem Bible suggests that this verse has "a Johannine flavour", observing that "awareness of Christ's divine sonship exists in the deepest stratum of the synoptic tradition as well as in [John]."

=== Verse 28 ===
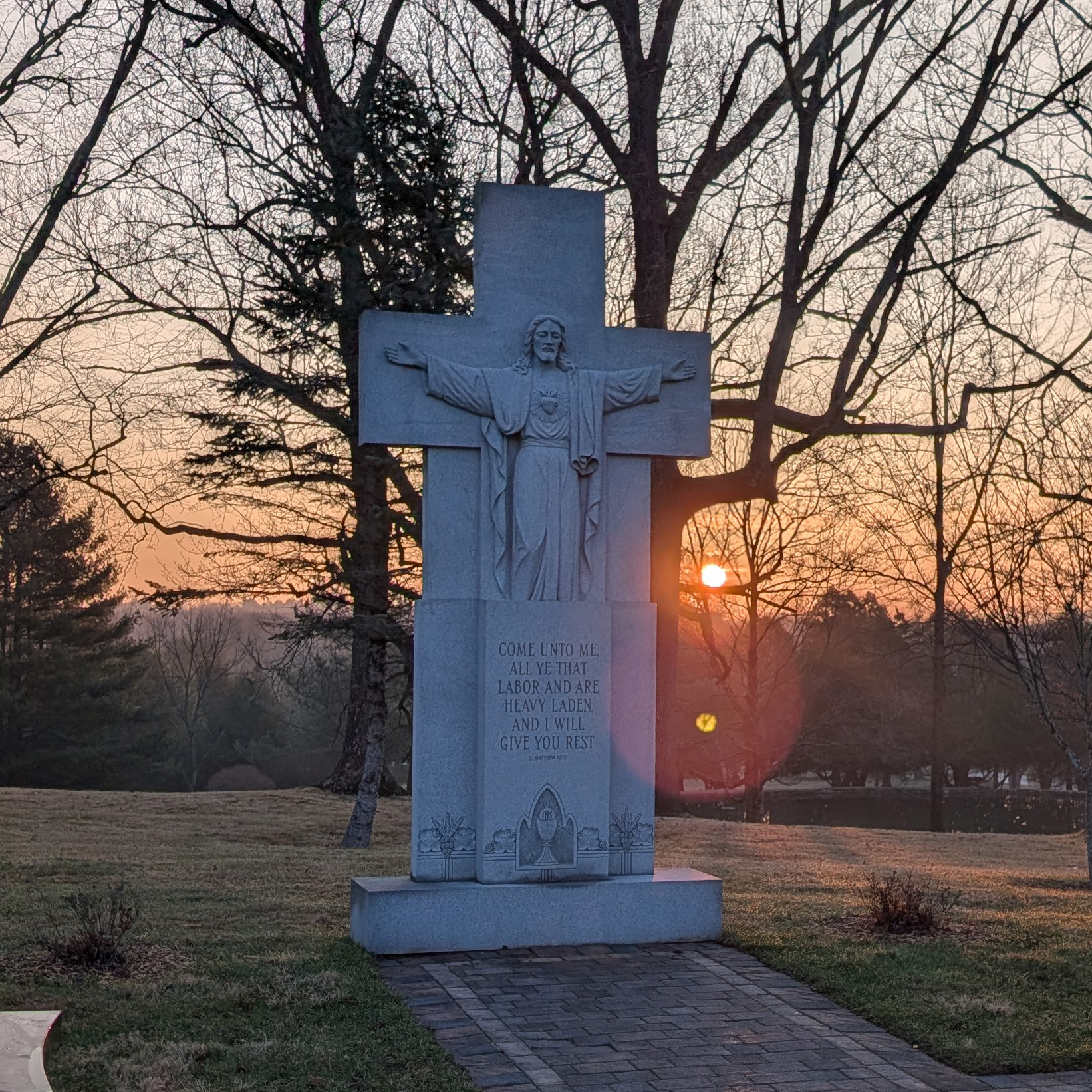
A statue of the Sacred Heart with Matthew 11:28 carved into its base

Come unto me, all ye that labour and are heavy laden,

and I will give you rest.

"Come unto me" (Greek: δεῦτε πρός με, deute pros me): also in Matthew 4:19, where the Greek: δεῦτε ὀπίσω μου, deute opiso mou, is often translated as "follow me". In verse 28 there is less thought of the process of coming than in the very similar invitation in John 7:37.

== Old manuscripts ==
=== Papyrus 62 (4th century) ===
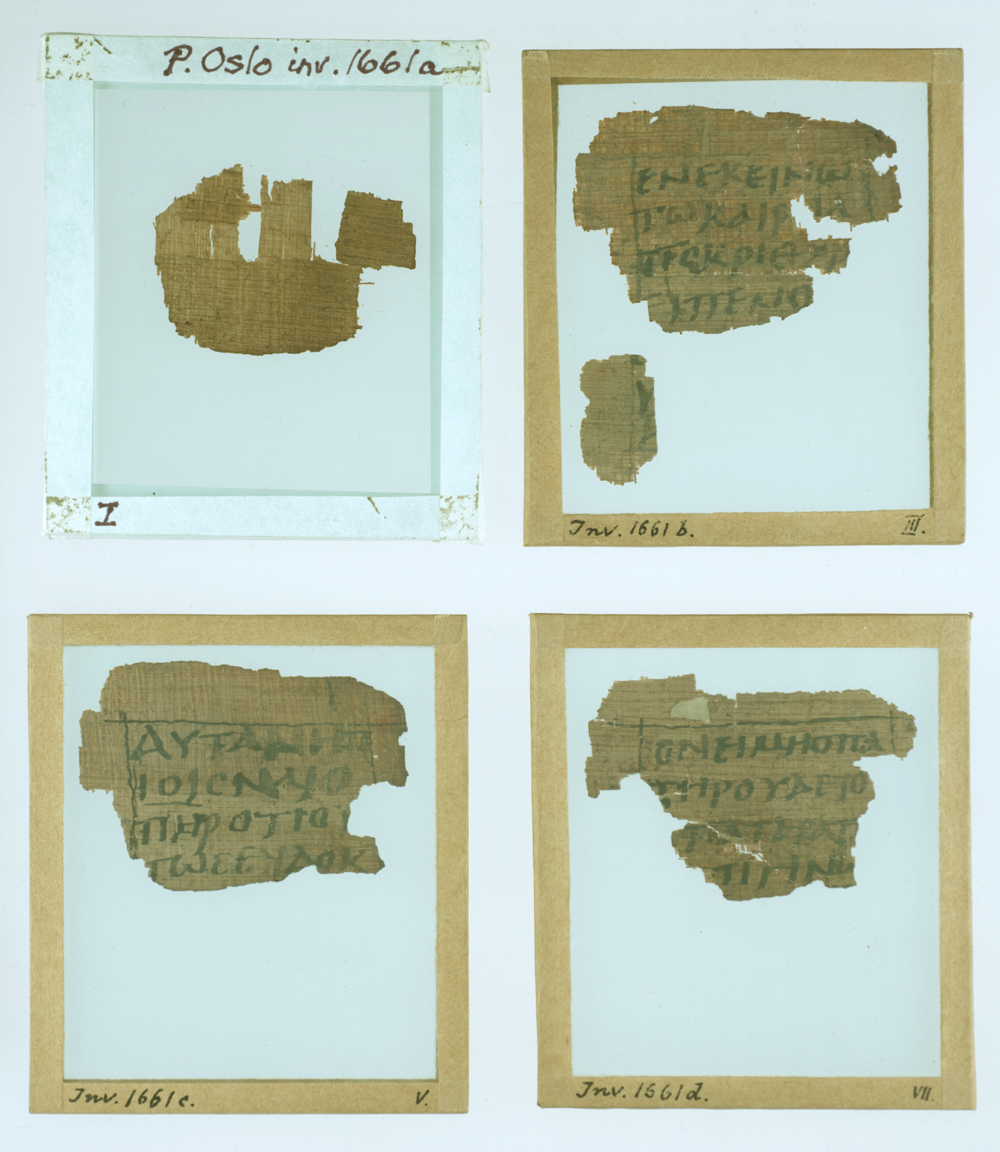
Mat 11.25–30 recto 1 3 5 7

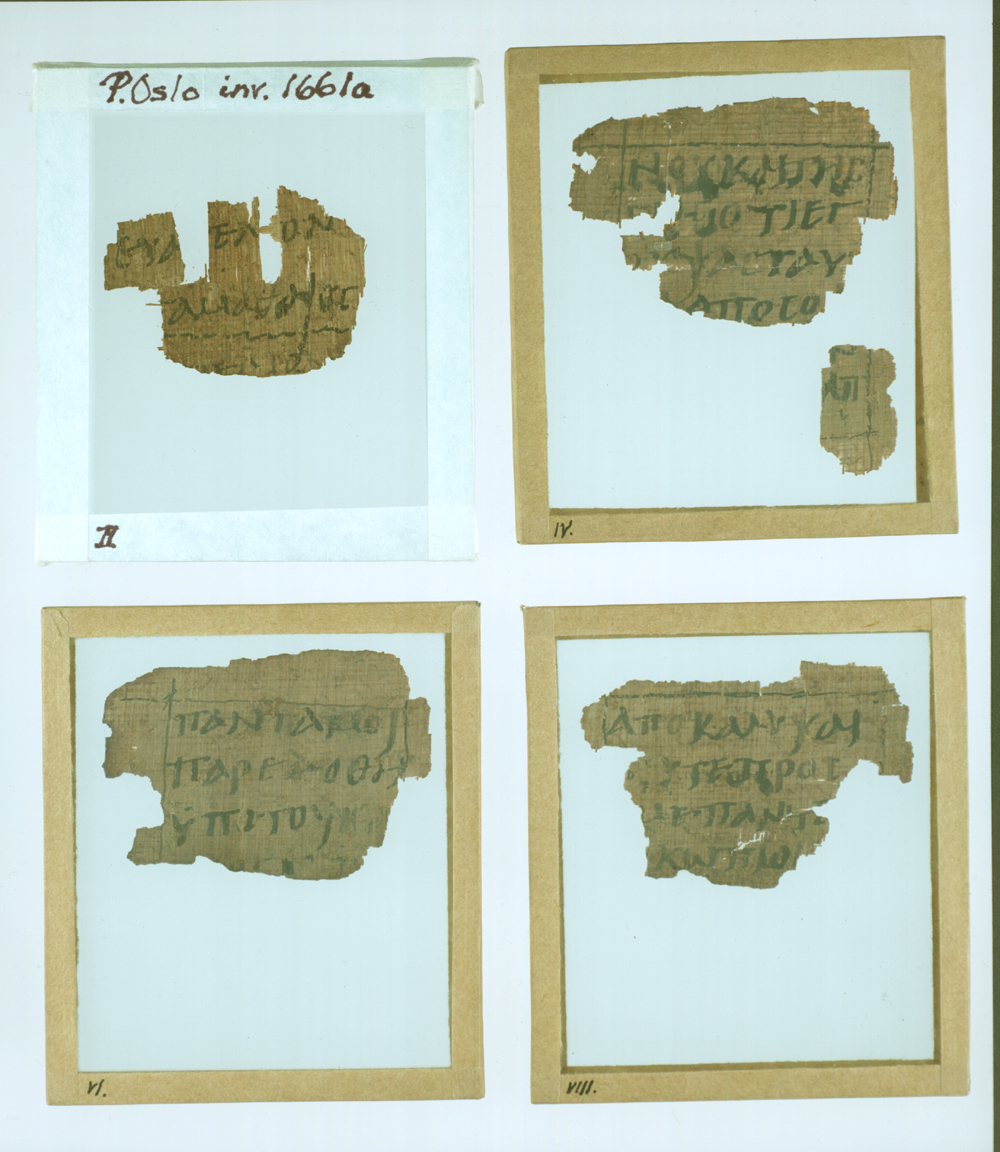
Mat 11.25–30 verso 2 4 6 8

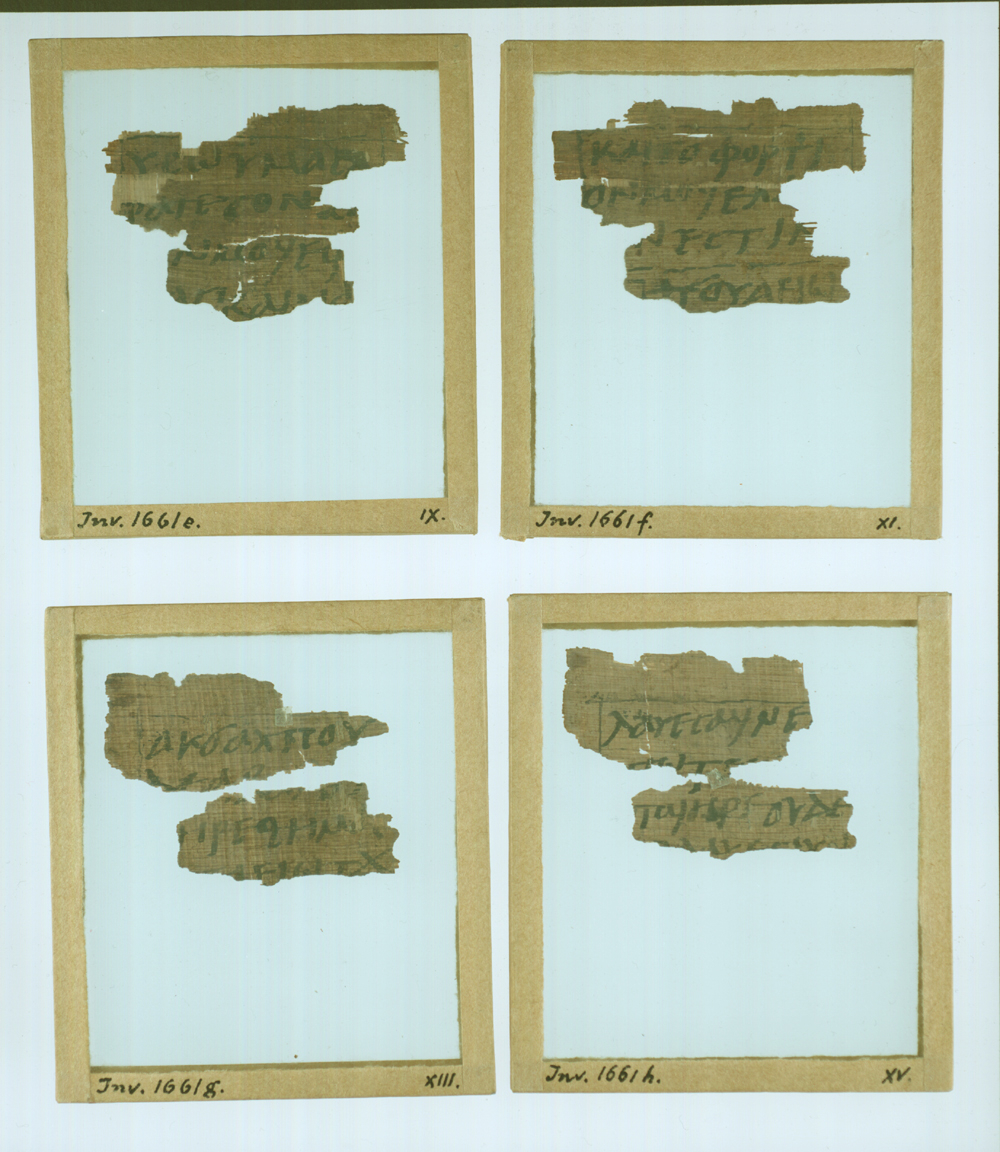
Mat 11.25–30 recto 9 11 13 15

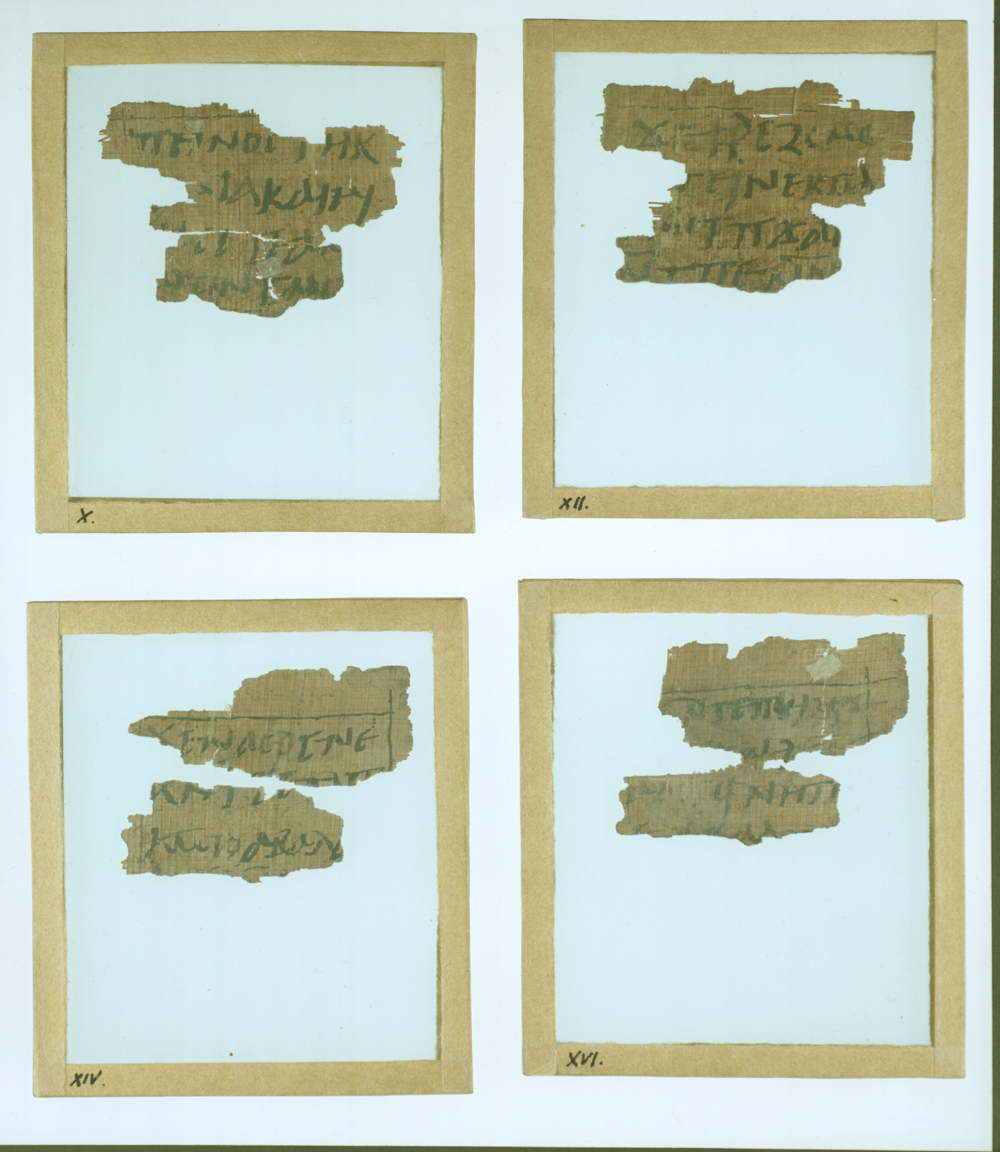
Mat 11.25–30 verso 10 12 14 16

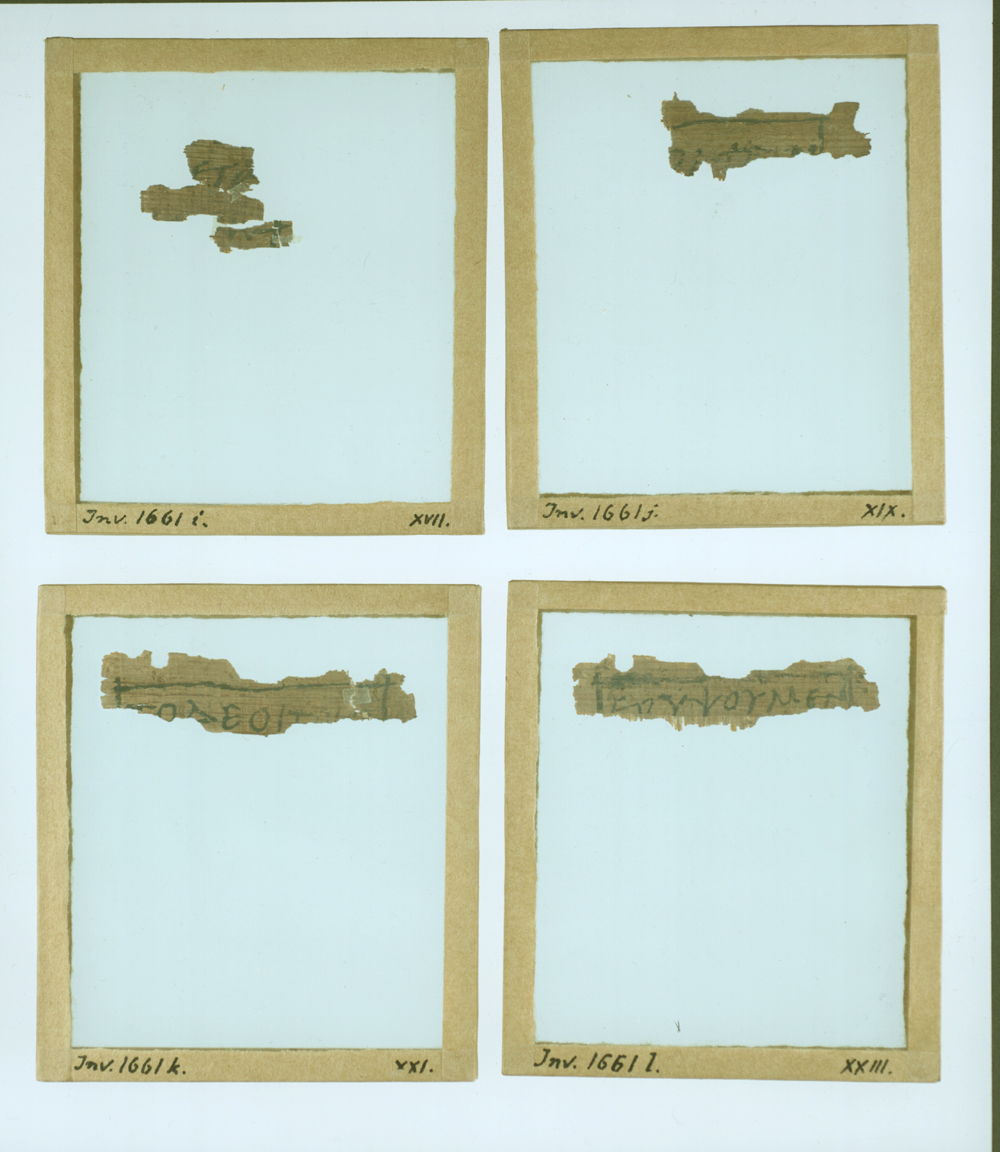
Mat 11.25–30 recto 17 19 21 23

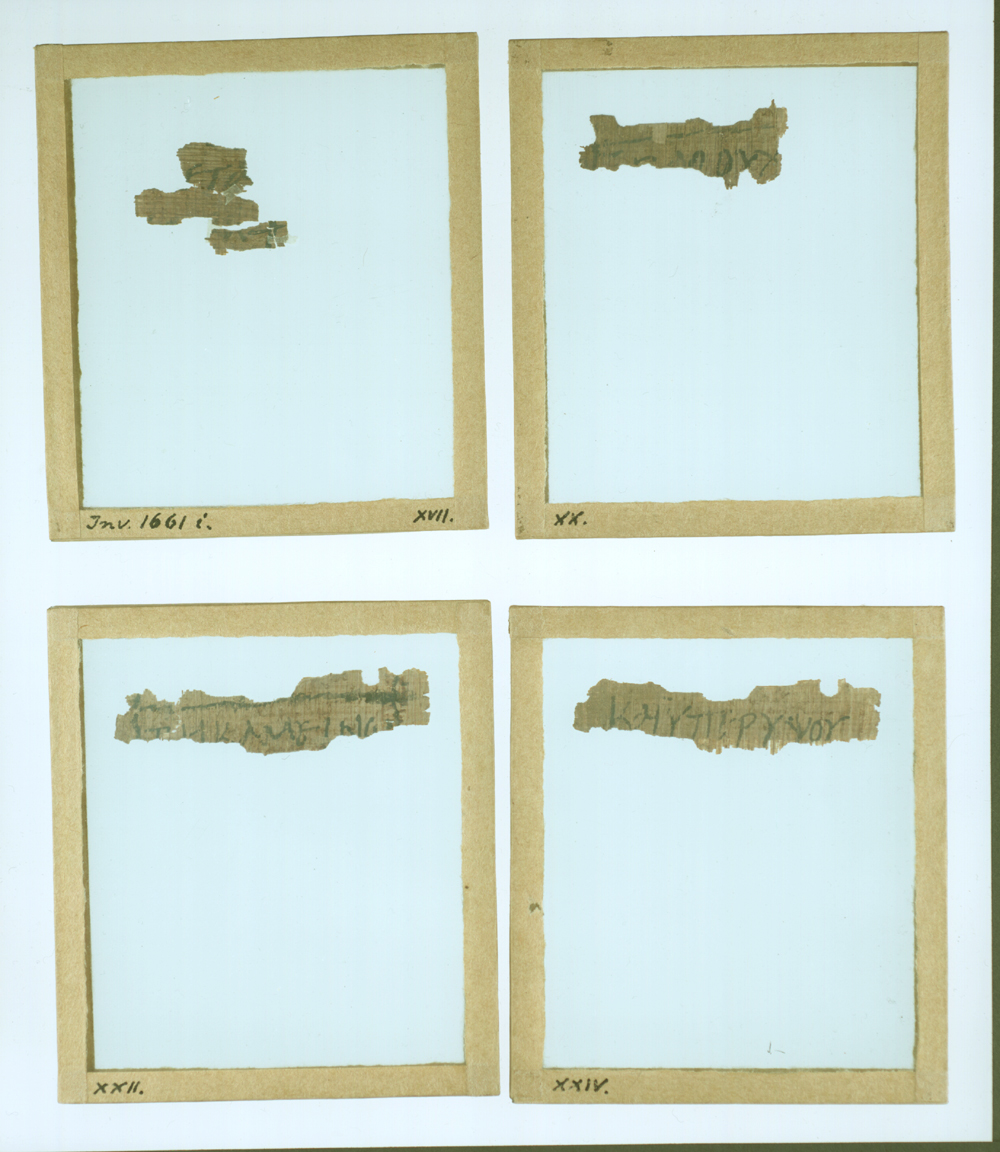
Mat 11.25–30 verso 18 20 22 24

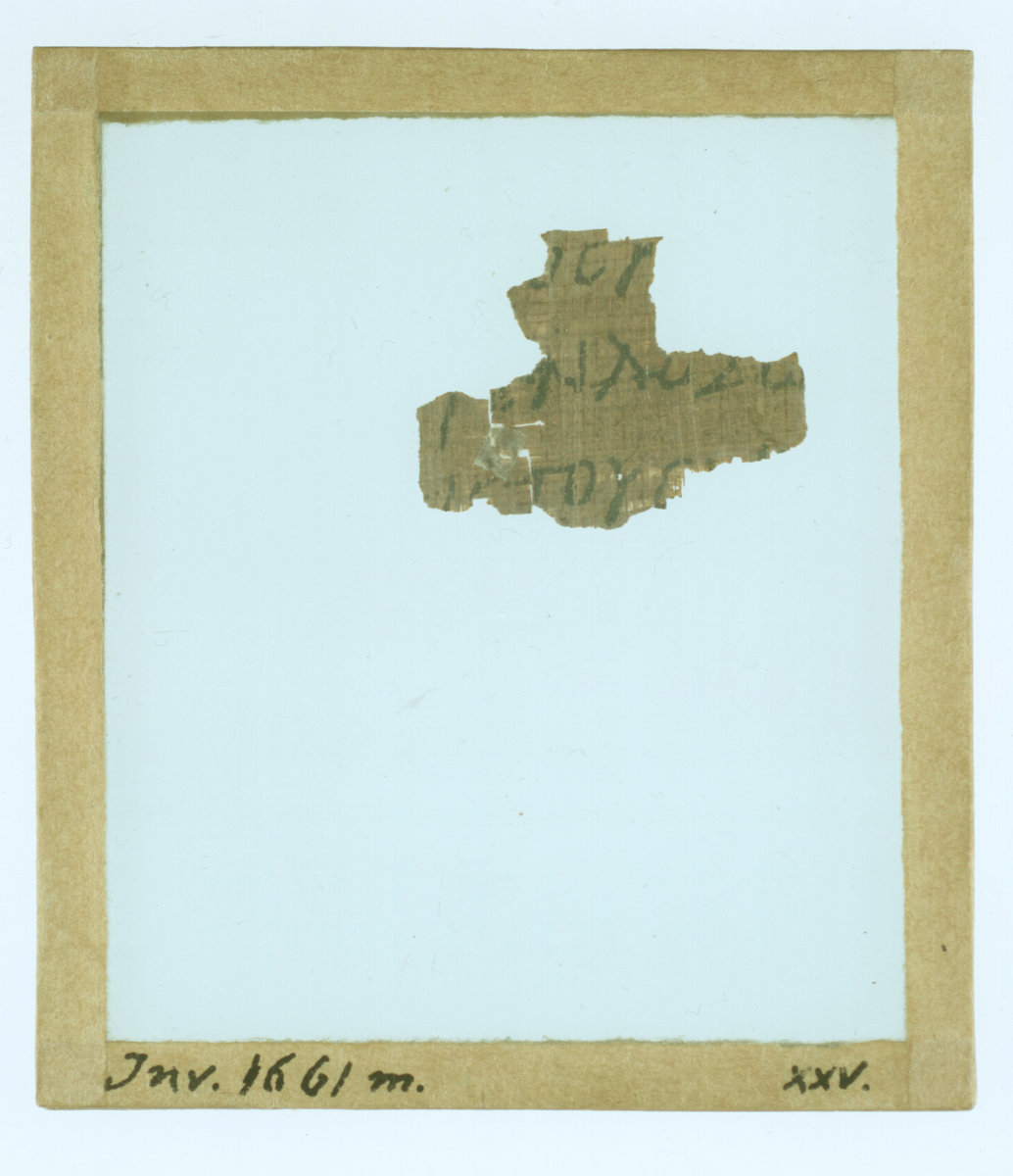
Mat 11.25–30 recto 25

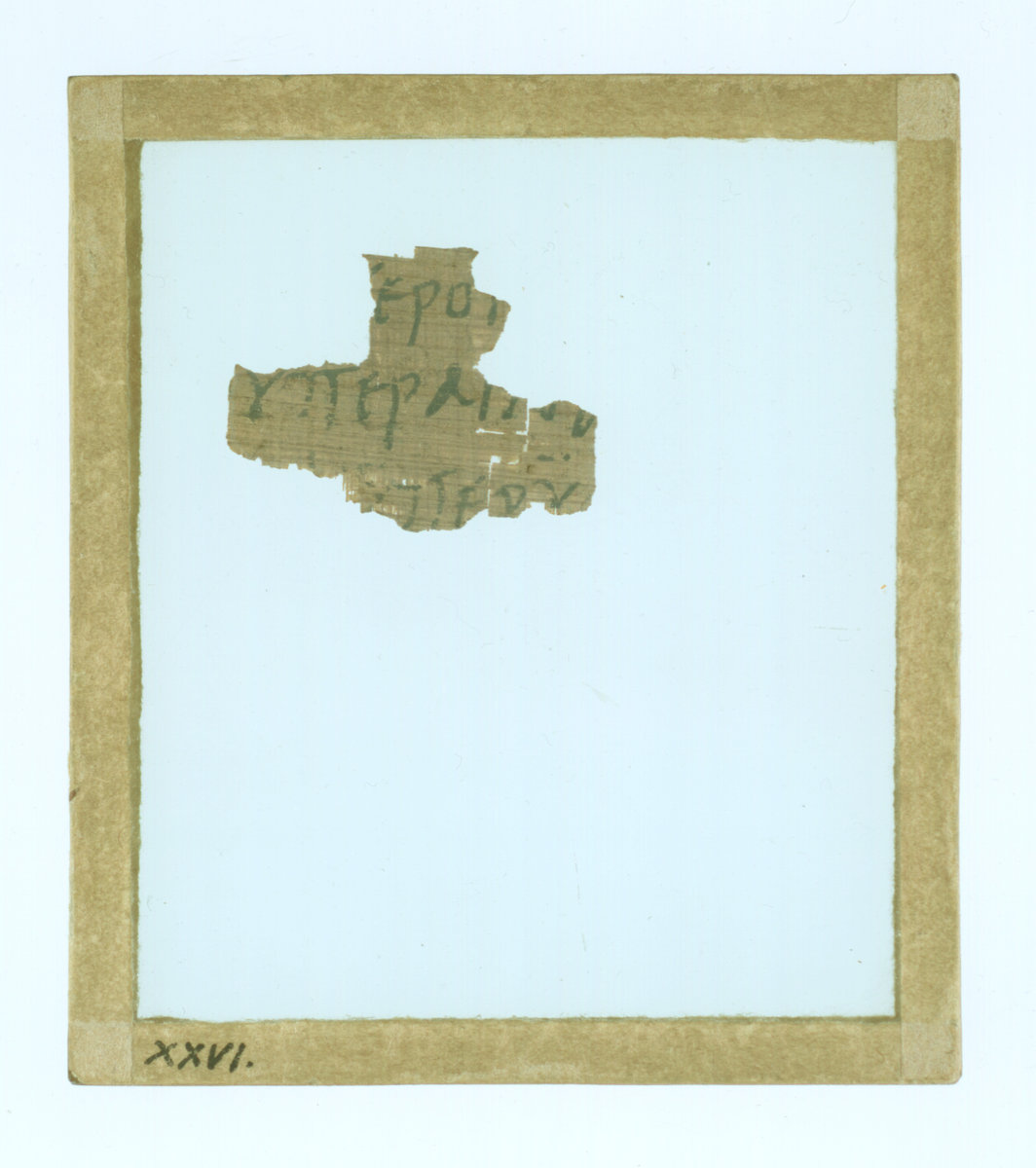
Mat 11.25–30 verso 26

== Uses ==
=== Music ===
The King James Version of verses 28–30 from this chapter are cited as texts in the English-language oratorio "Messiah" by George Frideric Handel (HWV 56).

== See also ==
- John the Baptist
- Weddings and Funerals
- Related Bible parts: Matthew 10, Mark 13, Luke 7, Luke 10, Luke 12, Luke 21
