= Church of the Holy Apostles (disambiguation) =

Church of the Holy Apostles or Church of the Twelve Apostles may refer to:

== Albania ==
- Holy Apostles' Church, Hoshtevë

== Armenia ==
- Church of the Holy Apostles (Ani)
- Church of the Holy Apostles, Sevanavank

== Germany ==
- Basilica of the Holy Apostles, Cologne

== Greece ==
- Church of the Holy Apostles, Athens
- Church of the Holy Apostles, Thessaloniki

== Israel ==
- Church of the Holy Apostles in Capernaum, Greek Orthodox

== Italy ==
- Church of the Twelve Holy Apostles, Rome
- Church of the Holy Apostles, Florence
- Church of the Holy Apostles of Christ, Venice
- Church of the Holy Apostles, Naples

== Romania ==
- Church of the Holy Apostles, Bucharest
- Church of the Holy Apostles, Focșani

== Russia ==
- Church of the Twelve Apostles in the Moscow Kremlin, known also as Church of the Holy Apostles

== Turkey ==
- Church of the Holy Apostles, Istanbul
- Church of the Holy Apostles, Kars

== United Kingdom ==
- Pro-Cathedral of the Holy Apostles, Bristol

== United States ==
- Holy Apostles Episcopal Church (Satellite Beach, Florida)
- Church of the Holy Apostles, Hilo, Hawaii
- Church of the Holy Apostles (Manhattan), New York
- Church of the Holy Apostles (Barnwell, South Carolina)
- Church of the Holy Apostles (Oneida, Wisconsin)

== See also ==
- Church of the Apostles (disambiguation)
- Chapel of the Apostles
