= Church of the Apostles =

Church of the Apostles may refer to:

== Movements ==
- Christianity of the Apostolic Age
- Any Apostolic see, any episcopal see whose foundation is attributed to one or more of the apostles of Jesus

== Buildings ==
- Church of Zion, Jerusalem, also known as the Church of the (Holy) Apostles on Mount Zion, are the remains of a Roman-era church in Jerusalem
- Church of the Apostles (Atlanta), an evangelical Anglican congregation in the Buckhead neighborhood of Atlanta, Georgia
- Cathedral Church of the Apostles, the cathedral of the ACNA Diocese of the Carolinas in Columbia, South Carolina
- Church of the Apostles, Launceston, a Catholic church in Launceston, Tasmania
- Monastery of the Holy Apostles in Capernaum, colloquially known as the Church of the Apostles

== See also ==
- Church of the Holy Apostles (disambiguation)
- Chapel of the Apostles
