= Matthew 4:16 =

- ← 4:15 4:17 →
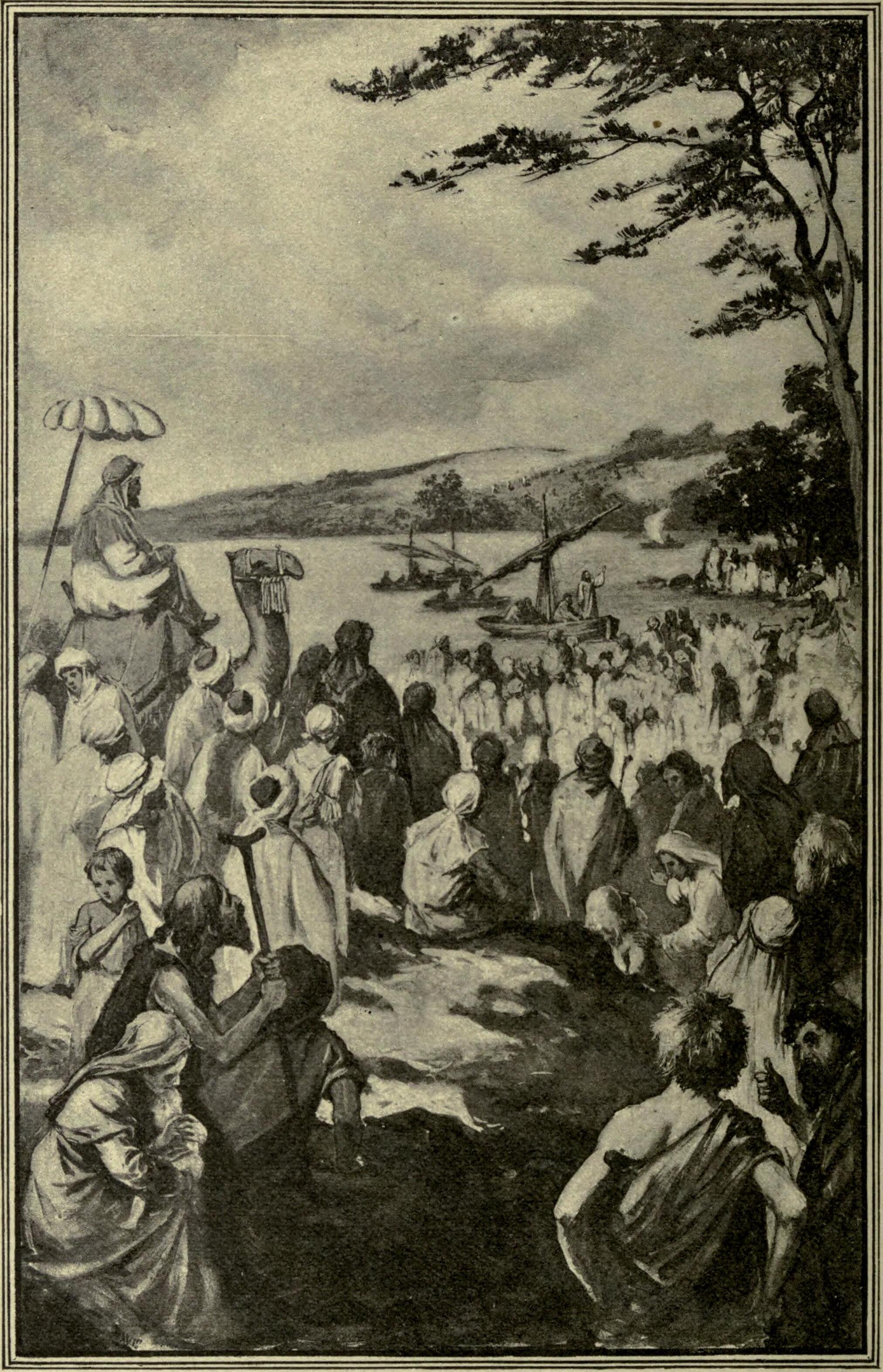
- "A company had gathered to hear Jesus, - an eager, expectant throng." Christ's Object Lessons by Ellen Gould Harmon White, page 32
- Book: Gospel of Matthew
- Christian Bible part: New Testament

Matthew 4:16 is the sixteenth verse of the fourth chapter of the Gospel of Matthew in the New Testament. In the previous verses Jesus returned to Galilee after hearing of the arrest of John the Baptist and then left Nazareth for Capernaum. This verse contains the second half of a quote from the Book of Isaiah, implying that these movements were preordained by scripture.

== Content ==
The original Koine Greek, according to Westcott and Hort, reads:

ο λαος ο καθημενος εν σκοτια φως ειδεν μεγα και τοις
καθημενοις εν χωρα και σκια θανατου φως ανετειλεν αυτοις

In the King James Version of the Bible the text reads:

The people which sat in darkness saw great light;
and to them which sat in the region and shadow of death
light is sprung up.

The World English Bible translates the passage as:

the people who sat in darkness saw a great light,
to those who sat in the region and shadow of death,
to them light has dawned."

For a collection of other versions see BibleHub Matthew 4:16

== Analysis ==
This verse is based on Isaiah 9:2 in the Old Testament. This verse refers to the lands of Zebulun and of Naphtali mentioned in the previous verse, and where Jesus has chosen to reside according to Matthew 4:13. The verse is referring to the Assyrian invasion of Northern Israel and predicting that after this dark period a new light would shine. Matthew implies that this is the messiah, France notes that the traditional view was that Isaiah was referring to events immediately after the departure of the Assyrians. Carter, who has advanced the thesis that much of Matthew is a prediction of the destruction of the Roman Empire, sees this verse as political in nature with the conquering Assyrians an allegory for the current Roman domination of the region.

Albright and Mann note that in Greek this verse contains elements of three different versions of the Septuagint. It was long thought to be a composite of these various translations, but it could also be taken from a lost version of the LXX. This is a more accurate copy of the LXX than the previous verse, but there are still some important changes. Albright and Mann note that the author of Matthew puts the verse in the past tense so that it fits better with his narrative. Hill state that Matthew also changes the word shone to dawned. Hill argues that this change was made to fit with Matthew's portrayal of the dawning of the new messiah rather than the continuous shining of God. Shedinger notes that the LXX has the people walking while Matthew has them sitting. Stendahl argues that this was done to more closely link the verse to the set geographical locales mentioned in 4:15.

Shedinger rejects the traditional view that Matthew 4:16 is merely a corrupted version of Isaiah 9:2. Rather he feels that in the earliest version of Matthew this verse was a combination of Isaiah 9:2 and Psalm 107:10, however later translators missed the second OT reference and over time altered the verse to make it conform more to Isaiah. Shedinger notes that there are surviving copies of this verse from before the fourth century and the original format could very well have been lost. Shedinger's theory is based on analysis of early non-Greek sources that might have had access to a lost version.

Sat is a literal translation from the Greek, but Fortna notes that it misses the emotional meaning of the phrase. he suggests that languished or wasted away would more precisely match the tone of the original.

== Commentary from the Church Fathers ==
Jerome: Or we must read, beyond Jordan, of Galilee of the Gentiles; so, I mean, that the people who either sat, or walked in darkness, have seen light and that not a faint light, as the light of the Prophets, but a great light, as of Him who in the Gospel speaks thus, I am the light, of the world. Between death and the shadow of death I suppose this difference; death is said of such as have gone down to the grave with the works of death; the shadow of such as live in sin, and have not yet departed from this world; these may, if they will, yet turn to repentance.

Pseudo-Chrysostom: Otherwise, the Gentiles who worshipped idols, and dæmons, were they who sat in the region of the shadow of death; the Jews, who did the works of the Law, were in darkness, because the righteousness of God was not yet manifested to them.

Chrysostom: But that you may learn that he speaks not of natural day and night, he calls the light, a great light, which is in other places called the true light; and he adds, the shadow of death, to explain what he means by darkness. The words arose, and shined, shew, that they found it not of their own seeking, but God Himself appeared to them, they did not first run to the light; for men were in the greatest miseries before Christ's coming; they did not walk but sate in darkness; which was a sign that they hoped for deliverance; for as not knowing what way they should go, shut in by darkness they sate down, having now no power to stand. By darkness he means here, error and ungodliness.

Rabanus Maurus: In allegory, John and the rest of the Prophets were the voice going before the Word. When prophecy ceased and was fettered, then came the Word, fulfilling what the Prophet had spoken of it, He departed into Galilee, i. e. from figure to verity. Or, into the Church, which is a passing from vice to virtue. Nazareth is interpreted ‘a flower,’ Capernaum, ‘the beautiful village;’ He left therefore the flower of figure, (in which was mystically intended the fruit of the Gospel,) and came into the Church, which was beautiful with Christ's virtues. It is by the sea-coast, because placed near the waves of this world, it is daily beaten by the storms of persecution. It is situated between Zabulon and Naphtali, i. e. common to Jews and Gentiles. Zabulon is interpreted, ‘the abode of strength;’ because the Apostles, who were chosen from Judæa, were strong. Nephtali, ‘extension,’ because the Church of the Gentiles was extended through the world.

Augustine: John relates in his Gospel the calling of Peter, Andrew, and Nathanael, and the miracle in Cana, before Jesus’ departure into Galilee; all these things the other Evangelists have omitted, carrying on the thread of their narrative with Jesus’ return into Galilee. We must understand then that some days intervened, during which the things took place concerning the calling of the disciples which John relates.

Saint Remigius: But this should be considered with more care, viz. that John says that the Lord went into Galilee, before John the Baptist was thrown into prison. According to John's Gospel after the water turned into wine, and his going down to Capernaum, and after his going up to Jerusalem, he returned into Judæa and baptized, and John was not yet cast into prison. But here it is after John's imprisonment that He retires into Galilee, and with this Mark agrees. But we need not suppose any contradiction here. John speaks of the Lord's first coming into Galilee, which was before the imprisonment of John. (John 4:3.) He speaks in another place of His second coming, into Galilee, and the other Evangelists mention only this second coming into Galilee which was after John's imprisonment.

Eusebius: It is related that John preached the Gospel almost up to the close of his life without setting forth any thing in writing, and at length came to write for this reason. The three first written Gospels having come to his knowledge, he confirmed the truth of their history by his own testimony; but there were yet some things wanting, especially an account of what the Lord had done at the first beginning of His preaching. And it is true that the other three Gospels seem to contain only those things which were done in that year in which John the Baptist was put into prison, or executed. For Matthew, after the temptation, proceeds immediately, Hearing that John was delivered up; and Mark in like manner. Luke again, even before relating one of Christ's actions, tells that Herod had shut up John in prison. The Apostle John then was requested to put into writing what the preceding Evangelists had left out before the imprisonment of John; hence he says in his Gospel, this beginning of miracles did Jesus.

Preceded by Matthew 4:15	Gospel of Matthew; Chapter 4	Succeeded by Matthew 4:17
