= Matthew 4:14–15 =

- ← 4:13 4:16 →
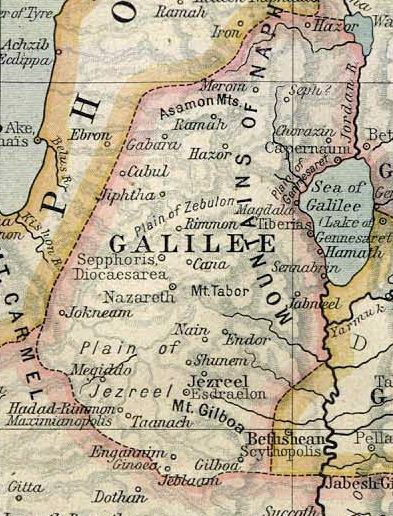
- A 1923 map showing Galilee at the time of Jesus. Capernaum is in the upper right while Nazareth is towards the center.
- Book: Gospel of Matthew
- Christian Bible part: New Testament

Land of Zebulon and Naphtali overlaid on the land of Galilee

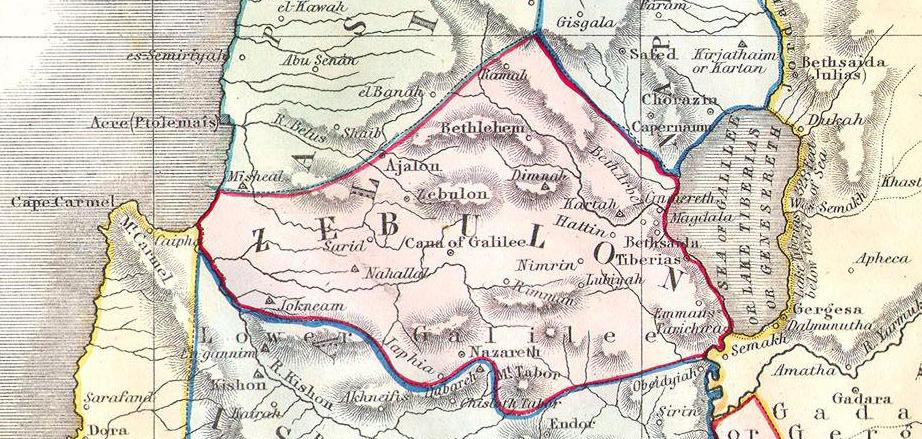
Land of Zebulon (left) and Naphtali (right) in Israel/Palestine according to its ancient divisions & tribes. Published by George Philip and Sons 1852.

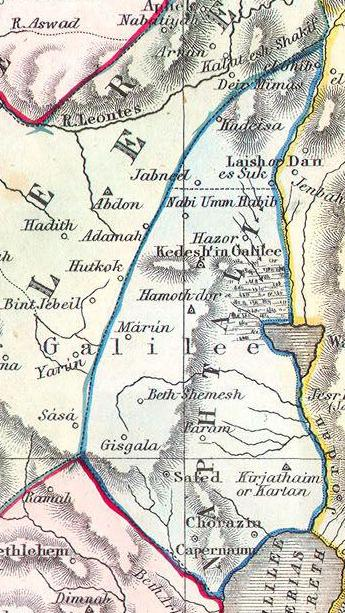

Matthew 4:14–15 are the fourteenth and fifteenth verses of the fourth chapter of the Gospel of Matthew in the New Testament. In previous verses, Jesus returned to Galilee after hearing of the arrest of John the Baptist and then left Nazareth for Capernaum. These verses introduce and then contain the first portion of a quote from the Book of Isaiah showing how these movements were preordained by scripture.

== Content ==
In the King James Version of the Bible the text reads:

14: That it might be fulfilled which was
spoken by Esaias the prophet, saying,
15: The land of Zabulon, and the land of Nephthalim, by the
way of the sea, beyond Jordan, Galilee of the Gentiles;

The World English Bible translates the passage as:

14: that it might be fulfilled which was
spoken through Isaiah the prophet, saying,
15: "The land of Zebulun and the land of Naphtali, toward
the sea, beyond the Jordan, Galilee of the Gentiles,

The Novum Testamentum Graece text is:

14:ἵνα πληρωθῇ τὸ ῥηθὲν
διὰ Ἠσαΐου τοῦ προφήτου λέγοντος
15:Γῆ Ζαβουλὼν καὶ γῆ Νεφθαλείμ, ὁδὸν θαλάσσης,
πέραν τοῦ Ἰορδάνου, Γαλιλαία τῶν ἐθνῶν,

For a collection of other versions see BibleHub Matthew 4:14, 4:15

== Analysis ==
Verse 14 is one of many in Matthew introducing an Old Testament (OT) prophecy. This uses the author of Matthew's standard "that it might be fulfilled" structure that appears many other times in the gospel.

The following verse is then based on Isaiah 9:1 in the Old Testament, which, in the King James Version, reads:

Nevertheless the dimness shall not be such as was in her vexation,
when at the first he lightly afflicted
the land of Zebulun and the land of Naphtali,
and afterward did more grievously afflict her
by the way of the sea, beyond Jordan, in Galilee of the nations.

The author of Matthew considerably abbreviates the verse. France notes that Matthew seems to only be interested in highlighting the locations, such that the grammatical links that make Isaiah 9:1 comprehensible are left out. Yet the following OT verse (Isaiah 9:2), which points towards the salvation of a Messiah, is quoted in full in the following NT verse; see Matthew 4:16.

Capernaum, where Jesus had relocated, was in the region of the Tribe of Naphtali in Galilee, it was also near the land of the Tribe of Zebulun. In the Greek "toward the sea" ("by the way of the sea") refers to a specific route, and Jones feels it should perhaps be more accurately read as "on the road to the sea." In Isaiah this verse is in the section describing the Assyrian invasion of northern Israel. "Toward the sea, beyond the Jordan" thus refers to the geography from the view point of the Assyrian invaders. To them the region of Zebulun and Naphtali would be across the Jordan River on the way to the Mediterranean. In the Middle Ages the "way of the sea" became a common name for the trade routes through this area, based on this verse.

Gundry feels that the author of Matthew is trying to rework the statement so that it refers to the Sea of Galilee rather than the Mediterranean. Schweizer considers it odd that the phrase "beyond the Jordan" was not among those cut by the author of Matthew as it makes clear the geography was from a foreign perspective and also does not work with the sea in question being Galilee.

Gundry also notes that in the Masoretic text the last line reads "region of the Gentiles." The word for region is galil and can easily become Galilee, the switch does not much affect the meaning of the verse as Zebulun and Naphtali were both in Galilee. France notes that referring to Galilee as the area of the Gentiles was appropriate both when Isaiah and when Matthew were written. While Galilee had a large Jewish population the majority of the people were then Gentiles. The mention of the Gentiles is part of the important theme in Matthew of showing that Jesus' message is meant for both Jews and Gentiles. France notes that in Matthew there is a common pattern of Jesus being persecuted by the Jews, as had happened with the arrest of John the Baptist, but being turned by this persecution to more receptive Gentile audiences.

== Commentary from the Church Fathers ==
Jerome: They are said at the first time to be lightened from the burden of sin, because in the country of these two tribes, the Saviour first preached the Gospel; at the last time their faith was increased, most of the Jews remaining in error. By the sea here is meant the Lake of Gennesaret, a lake formed by the waters of the Jordan, on its shores are the towns of Capernaum, Tiberias, Bethsaida, and Corozaim, in which district principally Christ preached. Or, according to the interpretation of those Hebrews who believe in Christ, the two tribes Zabulon and Naphtali were taken captive by the Assyrians, and Galilee was left desert; and the prophet therefore says that it was lightened, because it had before suffered the sins of the people; but afterwards the remaining tribes who dwelt beyond Jordan and in Samaria were led into captivity; and Scripture here means that the region which had been the first to suffer captivity, now was the first to see the light of Christ's preaching. The Nazarenes again interpret that this was the first part of the country that, on the coming of Christ, was freed from the errors of the Pharisees, and after by the Gospel of the Apostle Paul, the preaching was increased or multiplied throughout all the countries of the Gentiles.

Glossa Ordinaria: But Matthew here so quotes the passage as to make them all nominative cases referring to one verb. The land of Zabulon, and the land of Naphtali, which is the way of the sea, and which is beyond Jordan, viz. the people of Galilee of the Gentiles, the people which walked in darkness.

Glossa Ordinaria: Note that there are two Galilees; one of the Jews, the other of the Gentiles. This division of Galilee had existed from Solomon's time, who gave twenty cities in Galilee to Hyram, King of Tyre; this part was afterwards called Galilee of the Gentiles; the remainder, of the Jews.

Preceded by Matthew 4:13	Gospel of Matthew; Chapter 4	Succeeded by Matthew 4:16
