= St. Andrew's Episcopal Church (Stamford, Connecticut) =

Historic church in Connecticut, United States

- St. Andrew's Protestant Episcopal Church
- U.S. National Register of Historic Places
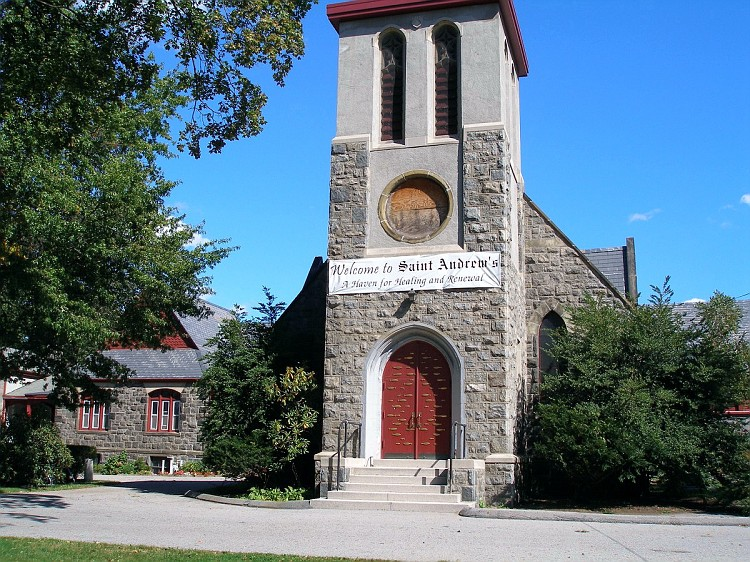

- Location within Connecticut Location within the United States
- Location: 1231 Washington Boulevard, Stamford, Connecticut
- Coordinates: 41°3′25.95″N 73°32′32.02″W
- Built: 1860
- Architect: Holly, Henry Hudson; Browne & Rogers
- Architectural style: Gothic
- MPS: Downtown Stamford Ecclesiastical Complexes TR (AD)
- NRHP reference No.: 83003510
- Added to NRHP: December 6, 1983

St. Andrew's Episcopal Church is a historic church at 1231 Washington Boulevard in Stamford, Connecticut.

The church reported 128 members in 2016 and 65 members in 2023; no membership statistics were reported in 2024 parochial reports. Plate and pledge income for the congregation in 2024 was $43,761 with average Sunday attendance (ASA) of 22.

Built in 1860 and consecrated on May 8, 1861, Saint Andrew's Church was originally a mission of St. John's Church Stamford until its incorporation as a parish on June 12, 1865. Saint Andrew's was the first free church in the diocese where parishioners did not have to pay a pew rental fee. St. Andrew's was listed on the National Register of Historic Places in 1983 as St. Andrew's Protestant Episcopal Church. Its church and parish hall are fine examples of Gothic architecture designed by Henry Hudson Holly.

== Current use ==
St. Andrew's Episcopal Church is an active Anglo-Catholic parish in the Episcopal Diocese of Connecticut. Mass is celebrated on weekdays Monday through Friday according to the Anglican Missal.

Sunday services include a Low Mass followed by a Sung Mass. All services at St. Andrew's Church are celebrated in traditional language, facing eastward. Music for services comes from both The Hymnal 1982 and Lift Every Voice and Sing II: An African American Hymnal.

== Clergy ==
- Francis Windsor Brathwaite (1865–1906)
- John Dolby Skene (1906–1920)
- Harley Wright Smith (1920–1927)
- Kenneth Ripley [last name illegible] 1936
- Percy Major Binnington (1941–1956)
- Richard Johnson (1956–1964)
- Norman Catir (1964–1970)
- Thomas George Peterson (1970–1974)
- Mark Anthony DeWolf (1975–1998)
- Richard Alton (2007–2014)
- Bartlett W. Gage (2014–current)

== See also ==
- St. Andrew's Episcopal Church
- National Register of Historic Places listings in Stamford, Connecticut
