= Jesus in the synagogue of Capernaum =

Miracle carried out by Jesus according to the Bible

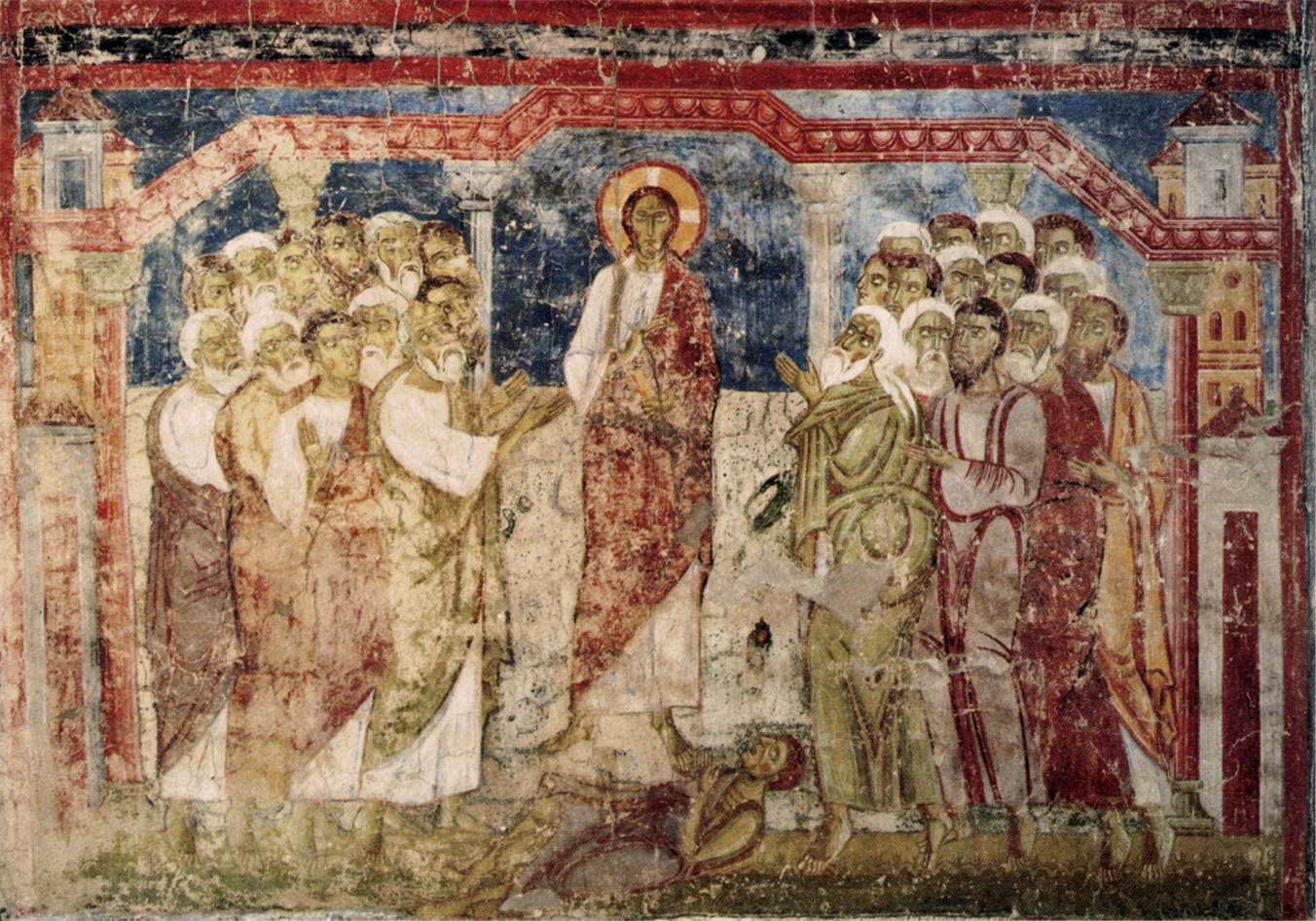
Eleventh century fresco of the Exorcism at the Synagogue in Capernaum

All four gospels report that Jesus visited Capernaum in Galilee and often attended the synagogue there:

- Matthew 4:13 describes Jesus leaving Nazareth and settling in Capernaum
- Mark 1:21–28 describes Jesus teaching and healing in the synagogue
- Luke 4:16–37 describes Jesus teaching regularly in the synagogue, cf. Luke 4:23, where Jesus, speaking in the Nazareth synagogue, refers to "what has been heard done" in Capernaum.
- John 6:22–59: contains Jesus' Bread of Life Discourse; verse 59 confirms that Jesus taught this doctrine in the Capernaum synagogue.

== Healing of a demoniac ==
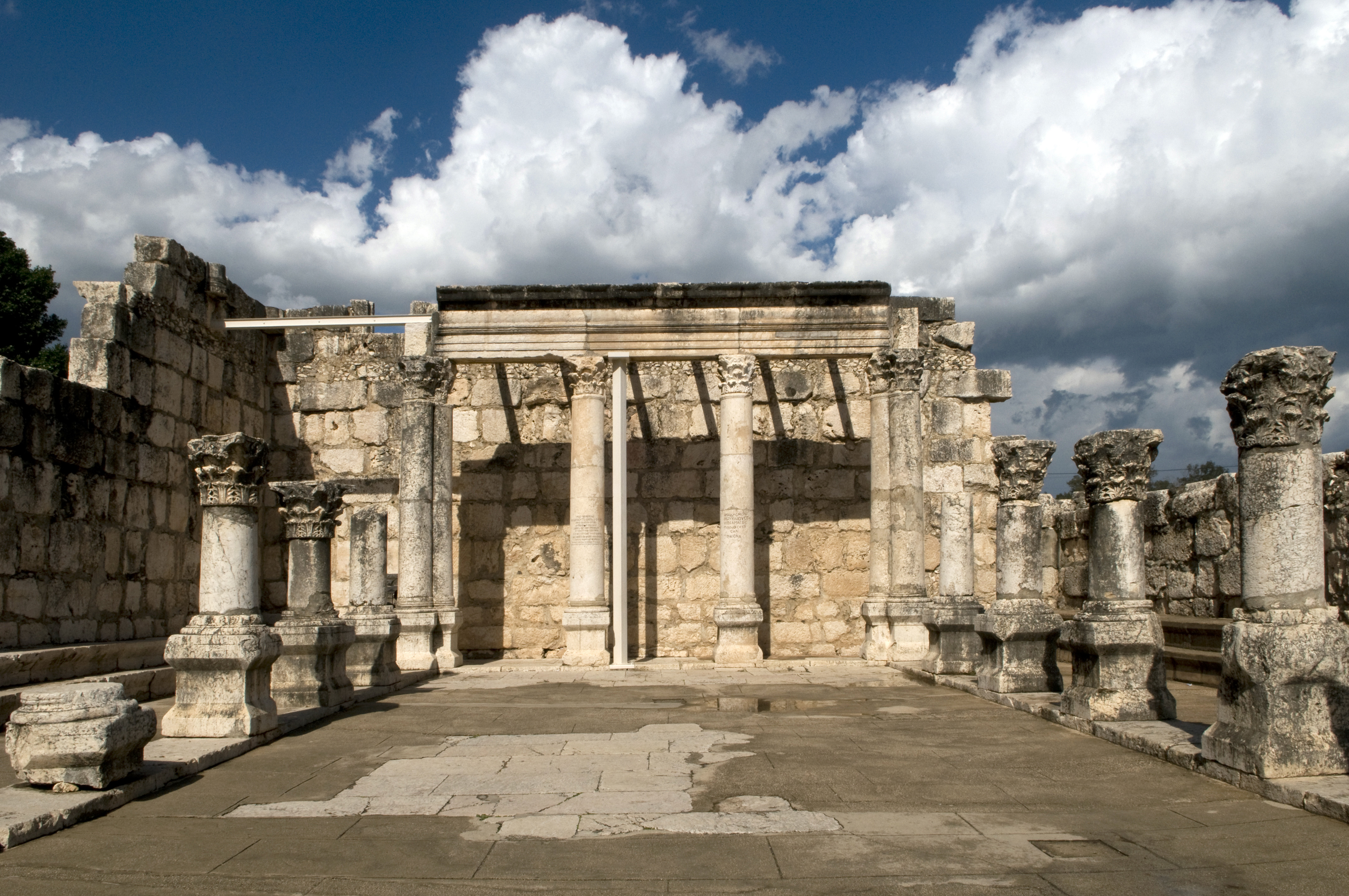
Ruins of the ancient Great Synagogue at Capernaum (or Kfar Nahum) from 4th century AD

An exorcism performed in the synagogue is recounted in Mark 1:21–28 and Luke 4:31–37. Mark's version reads:

They went to Capernaum, and when the Sabbath came, Jesus went into the synagogue and began to teach. The people were amazed at his teaching, because he taught them as one who had authority, not as the teachers of the law. Just then a man in their synagogue who was possessed by an impure spirit cried out, "What do you want with us, Jesus of Nazareth? Have you come to destroy us? I know who you are—the Holy One of God!" "Be quiet!" said Jesus sternly. "Come out of him!” The impure spirit shook the man violently and came out of him with a shriek.

— Mark 1:21–26

Luke's account adds that the evil spirit came out of the man "without harming him". Nicoll comments that this wording anticipates that the man would have been harmed. Mark concludes:

The people were all so amazed that they asked each other, "What is this? A new teaching—and with authority! He even gives orders to impure spirits and they obey him." News about him spread quickly over the whole region of Galilee.

— Mark 1:27–28

== Analysis ==
Roman Catholic theologian John Chijioke Iwe argues that the Markan pericope marks the beginning of the last year of the three years of the public ministry of Jesus.

John McEvilly points out that the spirit is called "unclean" since it delights in, and stimulates to, "acts of uncleanness".

== See also ==
- Life of Jesus in the New Testament
- Bread of Life Discourse
- Ministry of Jesus
- Miracles of Jesus
- Parables of Jesus

== Sources ==
- Iwe, John Chijioke (1991). Jesus in the Synagogue of Capernaum: The Pericope and its Programmatic Character for the Gospel of Mark. Serie Teologica 57. Tesi Gregoriana. ISBN 9788876528460.
- Talbert, Charles H. (2002). Reading Luke. ISBN 1573123935.
