= Matthew 4:13 =

- ← 4:12 4:14 →
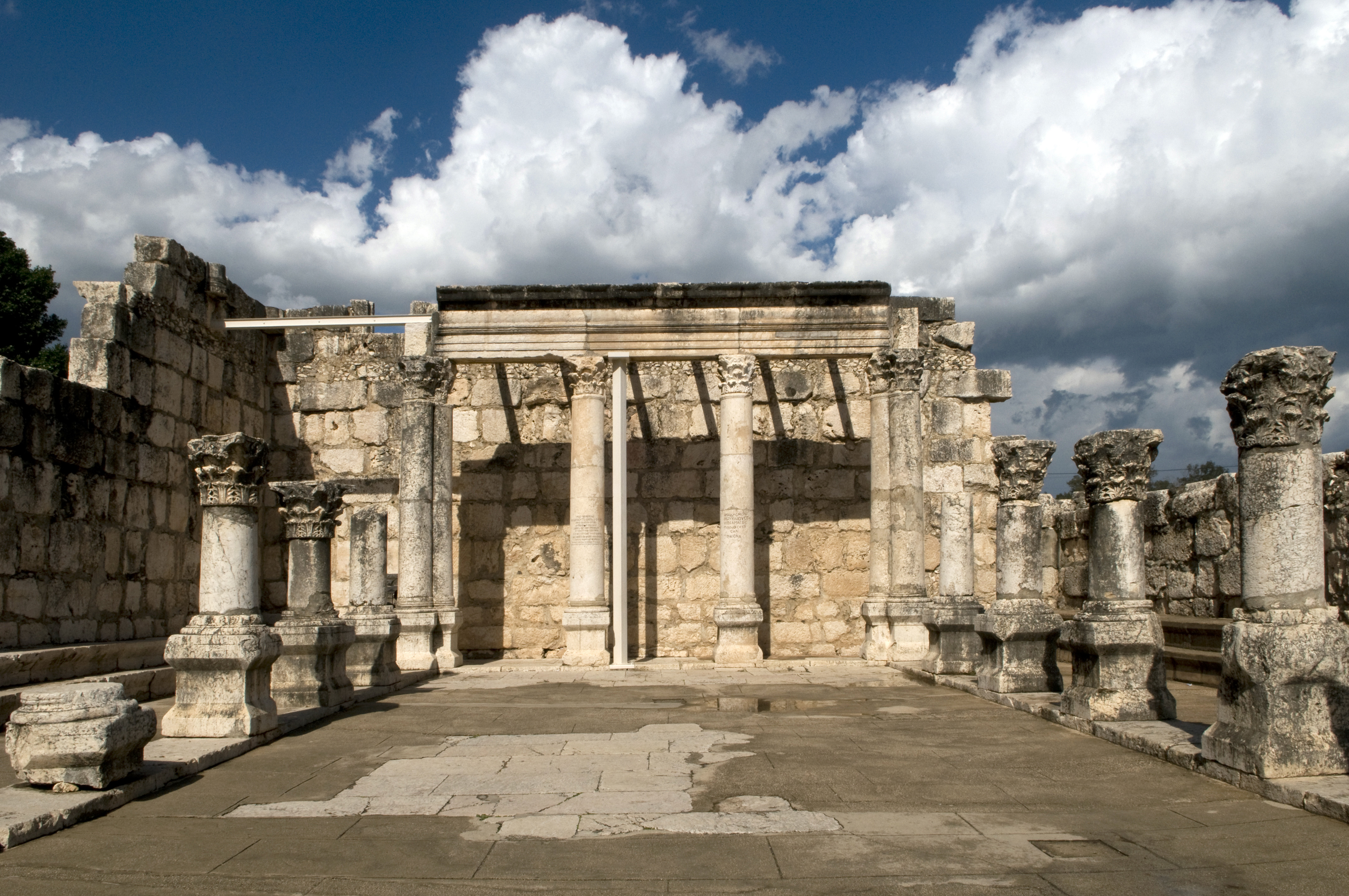
- Ruins of the ancient Great Synagogue at Capernaum (or Kfar Nahum) from 4th century CE.
- Book: Gospel of Matthew
- Christian Bible part: New Testament

Land of Zebulon and Naphtali overlaid on the land of Galilee

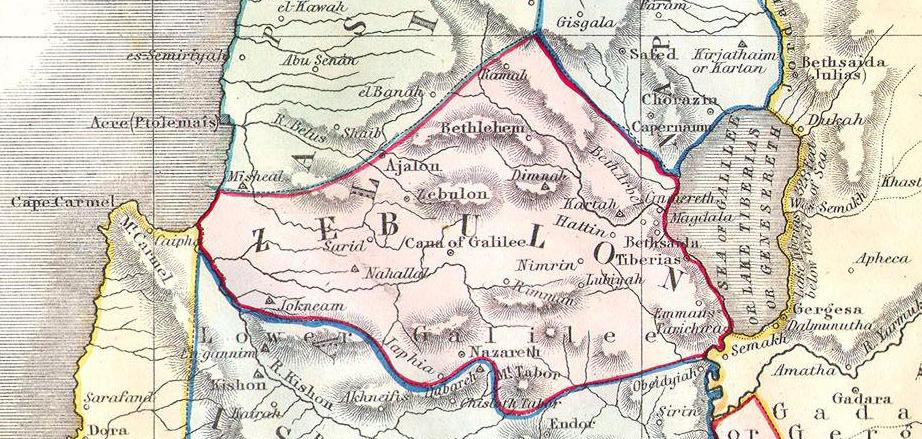
Land of Zebulon (left) and Naphtali (right) in Israel/Palestine according to its ancient divisions & tribes. Published by George Philip and Sons 1852.

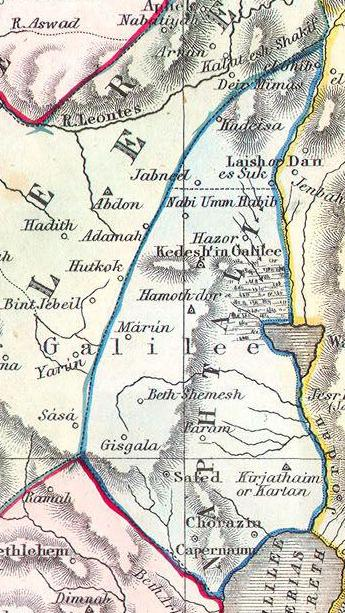

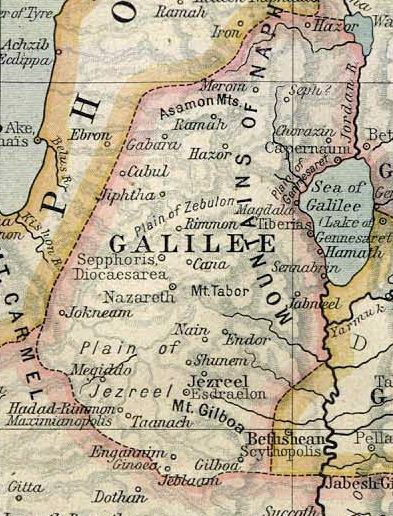
A 1923 map showing Galilee at the time of Jesus. Capernaum is in the upper right while Nazareth is towards the center.

Matthew 4:13 is the thirteenth verse of the fourth chapter of the Gospel of Matthew in the New Testament. In the previous verse, Jesus returned to Galilee after hearing of the arrest of John the Baptist. In this verse, he leaves from Nazareth to Capernaum.

== Content ==
In the King James Version of the Bible, the text reads:

And leaving Nazareth, he came and dwelt
in Capernaum, which is upon the sea coast,
in the borders of Zabulon and Nephthalim:

The World English Bible translates the passage as:

Leaving Nazareth, he came and lived in
Capernaum, which is by the sea, in
the region of Zebulun and Naphtali,

The Novum Testamentum Graece text is:

καὶ καταλιπὼν τὴν Ναζαρὰ ἐλθὼν κατῴκησεν
εἰς Καφαρναοὺμ τὴν παραθαλασσίαν
ἐν ὁρίοις Ζαβουλὼν καὶ Νεφθαλείμ·

For a collection of other versions see BibleHub Matthew 4:13.

== Analysis ==
It is presumed that after John's arrest, Jesus returned to Nazareth since Matthew 2:23 described it as the town where he was raised. Matthew does not specify why Jesus leaves Nazareth, but it might be because of his rejection by the residents of that town, as described in Luke 4:16-30. The original Greek of this verse has Nazareth spelt as "Ναζαρὰ" (Nazara). The only other place in the New Testament where this spelling occurs is in Luke 4:16. David Hill notes that this has led scholars to believe that both Matthew and Luke were copying from another document, likely the hypothetical Q. He adds that this has also led some to believe that the entirety of the rejection scene was in Q but that the author of Matthew decided to leave it out.

At the time of Jesus, Capernaum was a sizeable town on the northwest shore of the Sea of Galilee, with a population of perhaps ten thousand. The description of the town's location comes straight from the words of Isaiah that will be quoted in Matthew 4:15. Capernaum was located in Naphtali, but it was near Zebulun. The town is mentioned nowhere in the Old Testament, but both the town and Jesus' attendance at its synagogue feature in all four Gospels. Matthew is the only source that has Jesus actually living in the town. The other three have him only preaching and meeting his disciples there. This also seems to conflict with the other gospels and the rest of Matthew, especially Matthew 8:20, which portray Jesus as an itinerant preacher with no permanent home. Dick France feels that the town was less a home and more a base of operations to which Jesus and the disciples would occasionally return. Robert Gundry rejects this view: to him, dwelt unambiguously means that Jesus set up house in the town. Gundry feels that the author of Matthew embellished the accounts of Jesus' visits to Capernaum to better fit the quote from Isaiah. Matthew 11:23 has Jesus speaking out against the town.

Matthew does not mention why Jesus chose Capernaum to relocate to. The town was prosperous due to its location on the large lake and also its position on the Via Maris, the Damascus to Egypt trade route. France feels it was probably because the sizeable community offered more opportunities to preach. Albright and Mann support the theory that Jesus was already good friends with the disciples prior to recruiting them, and that Jesus specifically chose to move to Capernaum to be close to them.

Matthew here, and throughout the Gospel, refers to the local body of water as a sea. As it contains fresh water, by modern definitions it is more properly a lake. Luke refers to it as a lake, as does Josephus, but Mark and John join Matthew in calling it a sea. As a result, "Sea of Galilee" is still the standard modern name.

== Commentary from the Church Fathers ==
Glossa Ordinaria: He came as Luke writes to Nazareth, where He had been brought up, and there entering into the synagogue, He read and spoke many things, for which they sought to throw Him down from the rock, and thence He went to Capernaum; for which Matthew has only, And leaving the town of Nazareth, He came and dwelt at Capernaum.

Glossa Ordinaria: Nazareth is a village in Galilee near Mount Tabor; Capernaum a town in Galilee of the Gentiles near the Lake of Gennesaret; and this is the meaning of the word, on the sea coast. He adds further in the borders of Zabulon and Naphtali, where was the first captivity of the Jews by the Assyrians. Thus where the Law was first forgotten, there the Gospel was first preached; and from a place as it were between the two it was spread both to Jews and Gentiles.

Saint Remigius: He left one, viz. Nazareth, that He might enlighten more by His preaching and miracles. Thus leaving an example to all preachers that they should preach at a time and in places where they may do good, to as many as possible. In the prophecy, the words are these, At that first time the land of Zabulon and the land of Naphtali was lightened, and at the last time was increased the way of the sea beyond Jordan, Galilee of the Gentiles (Isaiah 9:1).

Preceded by Matthew 4:12	Gospel of Matthew; Chapter 4	Succeeded by Matthew 4:14
