= St. Andrew's Episcopal Church =

Saint Andrew's Episcopal Church, or variants thereof, may refer to:

== United States ==
=== Alabama ===
- St. Andrew's Episcopal Church (Birmingham, Alabama), listed on the NRHP
- St. Andrew's Episcopal Church (Prairieville, Alabama), National Historic Landmark and listed on the NRHP

=== Arkansas ===
- Saint Andrew's Episcopal Church (Mammoth Spring, Arkansas), listed on the NRHP in Fulton County, Arkansas

=== California ===
- St. Andrew's Episcopal Church, Saratoga, founder of Saint Andrew's School, Saratoga, California

=== Colorado ===
- St. Andrew's Episcopal Church (Denver, Colorado), listed on the NRHP in downtown Denver, Colorado

=== Connecticut ===
- St. Andrew's Episcopal Church (Stamford, Connecticut), listed on the NRHP
- St. Andrew's Episcopal Church (Washington, Connecticut), listed on the NRHP

=== Florida ===
- St. Andrew's Episcopal Church (Fort Pierce, Florida). Its original building was moved to become Holy Apostles Episcopal Church
- St. Andrew's Episcopal Church (Jacksonville), listed on the NRHP
- St. Andrew's Episcopal Church (Tampa, Florida), listed on the NRHP

=== Georgia ===
- St. Andrew's Episcopal Church (Darien, Georgia)

=== Idaho ===
- St. Andrew's Episcopal Church (Mullan, Idaho), listed on the NRHP in Shoshone County, Idaho

=== Iowa ===
- St. Andrew's Episcopal Church (Waverly, Iowa)

=== Kansas ===
- St. Andrew's Episcopal Church (Emporia, Kansas)

=== Louisiana ===
- St. Andrew's Episcopal Church (Clinton, Louisiana), listed on the NRHP

=== Maryland ===
- St. Andrew's Episcopal Chapel (Sudlersville, Maryland), listed on the NRHP

=== Massachusetts ===
- St. Andrew's Episcopal Church (Hanover, Massachusetts), one of the oldest parishes in the Episcopal Diocese of Massachusetts

=== Michigan ===
- Saint Andrew's Memorial Episcopal Church, Detroit, Michigan

=== Missouri ===
- St. Andrew's Episcopal Church (Kansas City, Missouri)

=== New Hampshire ===
- St. Andrew's-by-the-Sea, Rye, New Hampshire, listed on the NRHP

=== New York ===
- St. Andrew's Episcopal Church (Albany, New York), listed on the NRHP in Albany, New York
- St. Andrew's Episcopal Church (Brewster, New York), listed on the NRHP
- St. Andrew's Episcopal Church (Buffalo, New York), listed on the NRHP
- St. Andrew's Episcopal Church (New York City), listed on the NRHP
- Saint Andrew's Episcopal Church (Rochester, New York), listed on the NRHP
- St. Andrew's Episcopal Church (Walden, New York), listed on the NRHP
- St. Andrew's Episcopal Church (Yaphank, New York), listed on the NRHP

=== North Carolina ===
- St. Andrew's Episcopal Church and Cemetery, Woodleaf, listed on the NRHP in Rowan County, North Carolina
- St. Andrew's On-The-Sound Episcopal Church, Wilmington, NC
- St. Andrew's By-The-Sea (Nags Head, North Carolina) Episcopal Church, Nags Head, NC

=== Ohio ===
- St. Andrew's Episcopal Church (Elyria, Ohio), listed on the NRHP in Lorain County, Ohio

=== Pennsylvania ===
- St. Andrew's Episcopal Church (Pittsburgh, Allegheny County, Pennsylvania)
- St. George Cathedral (Philadelphia), founded as Saint Andrew's Episcopal Church in 1822 until it was reconsecrated in 1921

=== Rhode Island ===
- St. Andrew's Episcopal Chapel (Woonsocket, Rhode Island), listed on the NRHP

=== South Carolina ===
- Old St. Andrew's Parish Church (Charleston, South Carolina) (ACNA), listed on the NRHP
- St. Andrew's Episcopal Church (Mount Pleasant, South Carolina) (ACNA), a historic district contributing property

=== South Dakota ===
- St. Andrew's Episcopal Church (Scotland, South Dakota), listed on the NRHP in South Dakota

=== Texas ===
- St. Andrew's Episcopal Church (Amarillo, Texas)
- Saint Andrew's Episcopal Church (Bryan, Texas), listed on the NRHP in Brazos County, Texas
- St. Andrew's Episcopal Church (Fort Worth, Texas) (ACNA)

=== Washington ===
- St. Andrew's Episcopal Church (Chelan, Washington), listed on the NRHP in Chelan County, Washington
- St. Andrew's Episcopal Church (Port Angeles, Washington), listed on the NRHP in Washington

== See also ==
- St. Andrew's Church (disambiguation)
- St Andrew (disambiguation)
