= Holy Apostles Episcopal Church (Satellite Beach, Florida) =

Holy Apostles Episcopal Church 505 Grant Avenue Satellite Beach, Florida
- Holy Apostles Episcopal Church 505 Grant Avenue Satellite Beach, Florida
- 28.18143°N 80.603682°W
- Denomination: Episcopal
- Website: Holy Apostles Episcopal Church website

History
- Dedication: Holy Apostles

Administration
- Province: IV
- Diocese: Central Florida
- Parish: Holy Apostles

Clergy
- Rector: Todd T. Schmidtetter

Holy Apostles Episcopal Church, is an historic Carpenter Gothic church building now located at 505 Grant Avenue in Satellite Beach, Florida in the United States. It was built in 1902 some 100 kilometers to the south in Fort Pierce to serve St. Andrew's Episcopal Church, which it did until March 25, 1959, when St. Andrew's moved into a much larger structure and gave its old building, less its organ and stained glass windows, to the old Episcopal Diocese of South Florida to be used as a mission church. The diocese gave it to Holy Apostles, which had been formed in 1957 and had been holding services in a synagogue, and it was barged up the Indian River on July 14, 1959 to Satellite Beach, where it became the first church building in that two-year-old city just south of Patrick Space Force Base.

== History ==
The future Holy Apostles Church was built in 1902 for St. Andrew's Mission on North 2nd Street in Fort Pierce and was consecrated in March 1905 by William Crane Gray, missionary bishop of South Florida. St. Andrew's first vicar was Gray's newly ordained son, Campbell Gray, who later became the second Bishop of Northern Indiana. In 1923 the building was moved to a waterfront location on the Indian River and in 1933 was enlarged to double its seating capacity.

On July 14, 1959, the old building was placed on a barge and towed by a small tugboat north up the Indian River to its new location in Satellite Beach. Hugh Cuthbertson, vicar of Holy Apostles, was on hand to give his blessing as the church began its journey from Fort Pierce. The tugboat was captained by a 17-year-old who proved himself more than equal to the task. After being unloaded at Satellite Beach, the church was pulled by a bulldozer to its present location over utility poles laid flat on the ground.

In the 1970s, Carleton Emery, one of Holy Apostles' charter members, made stained glass windows for the church to replace those that St. Andrew's had kept. In 1985 Holy Apostles achieved full parish status in the new Episcopal Diocese of Central Florida. Unlike many other Carpenter Gothic churches which feature large rose windows high on their fronts or backs, Holy Apostles has only a small pin-hole window high on its front.

== See also ==
- Episcopal Diocese of South Florida, Holy Apostles' original diocese.
- Church of the Holy Apostles (disambiguation)
- St. Andrew's Episcopal Church (disambiguation)
- Daniel T. McCarty, 31st governor of Florida, who died in office in 1953 and who was buried from this church when it was still in Fort Pierce.

== References and resources ==
- http://www.cfdiocese.org/news/pdf/cfe0501.pdf 40 pages, Central Florida Episcopalian, May 2001, article, Past and present intertwine in church and (Brevard) county, pp. 8–9, includes text on and picture of St. Andrew's/Holy Apostles, p. 8 (accessed 12-22-2007)
- http://www.rootsweb.com/~flslchs/andrews.htm Early history of St. Andrews Church, contains much the same information as Hellier's book, which is listed below, (accessed 12-22-2007)
- Hellier, Walter R., (with introduction by Marjory Stoneman Douglas), Indian River: Florida's Treasure Coast, (1965) Coconut Grove, Florida: Hurricane House Publishers, 5 pages of text on this church (pp. 107–111), with picture of church on p. 109. Library of Congress Catalog No. 65-24681 (copy borrowed from Martin County Library System, Stuart, Florida )
- Rights, Lucille Rieley, A Portrait of St. Lucie County, Florida, (1994) Virginia Beach: Donning Company, text and picture of church on barge on p. 163. ISBN 0-89865-917-5
- Williams, Ada Coats, Images of America: Fort Pierce, (2003) Charleston, South Carolina: Arcadia Publishing, picture of church on N. 2nd Street, p. 22. ISBN 0-7385-1530-2
