= Church of the Holy Apostles, Hilo, Hawaii =

Episcopal church in Hilo, Hawaii, US

Coordinates: 19.7023905°N 155.0777789°W

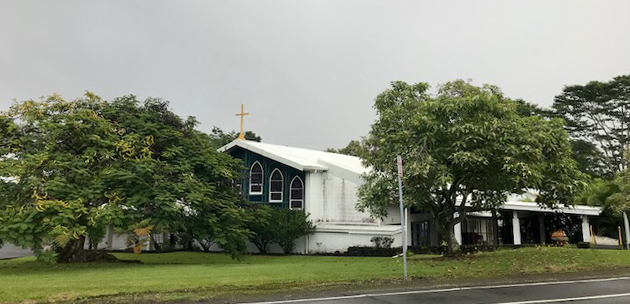
Church of the Holy Apostles, Hilo, Hawaii

The Church of the Holy Apostles is an Episcopal church, located in Hilo, Hawaii, that belongs to the Episcopal Diocese of Hawaii of the Episcopal Church's Province 8.

In 2015, the church reported 195 members; in 2023, it reported 240 members. No membership statistics were reported in 2024 national parochial reports. Plate and pledge financial support reported by the church in 2024 was $267,487. Average Sunday Attendance (ASA) reported in 2024 was 66 persons. This was a relative decrease from ASA of 110 reported in 2020.

== Overview ==
The Episcopal Church in Hawai'i began in 1862 when King Kamehameha IV and Queen Emma invited the Church of England to Hawai‘i.

The Church of the Holy Apostles in Hilo was founded in 1903, and moved to its current location (1407 Kapi'olani Street, Hilo, Hawai'i 96720), across from the University of Hawaiʻi at Hilo, in 1963.

The church encourages diversity and affirms LGBT brothers and sisters.

== See also ==
- Episcopal Diocese of Hawaii
