= Ocol Church =

Heritage site in Vrancea County, Romania

Coordinates: 45°42′28″N 27°11′00″E

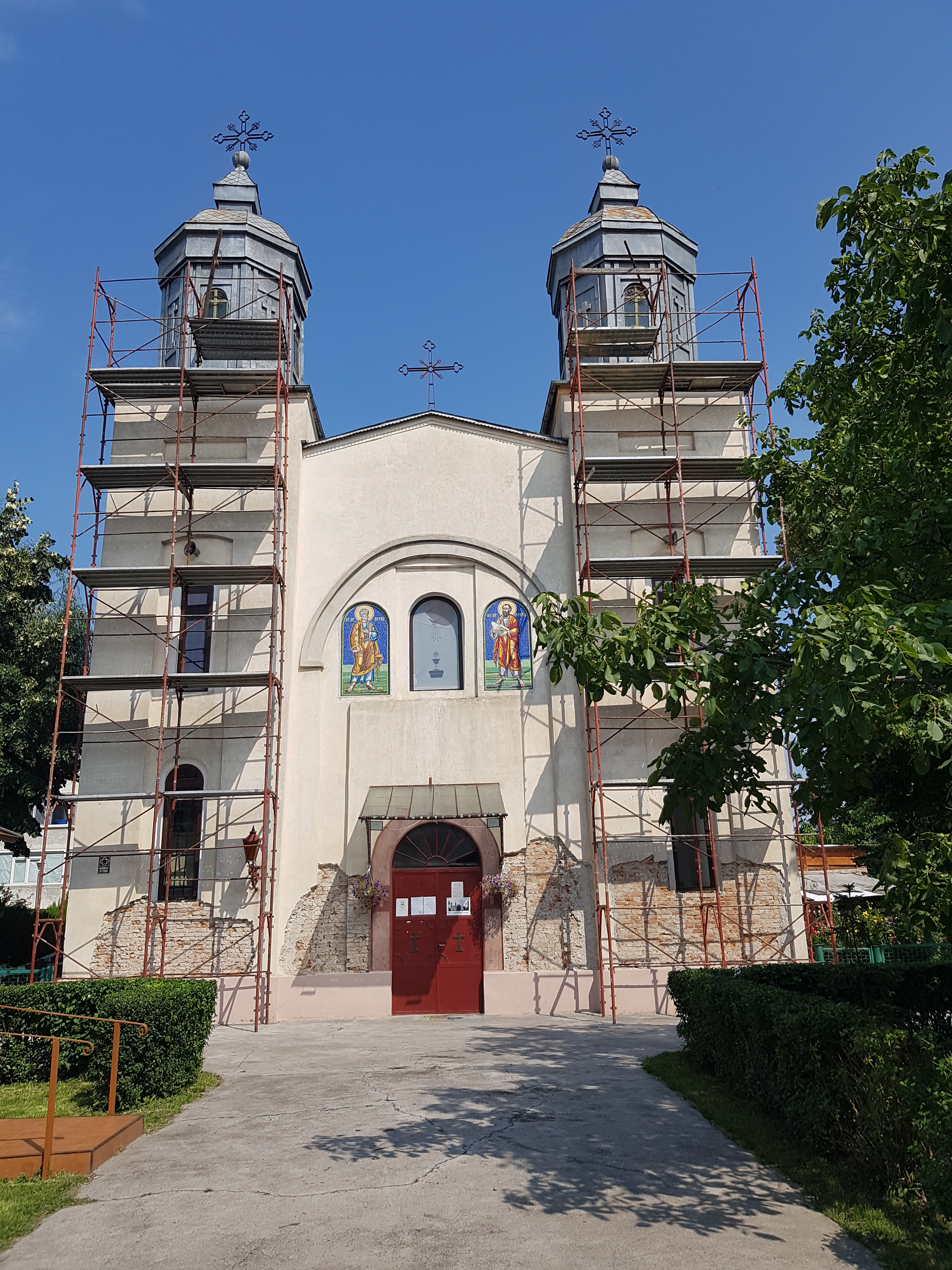
Ocol Church

The Ocol Church (Romanian: Biserica Sfinții Apostoli de la Ocol) is a Romanian Orthodox church located at 46 Independenței Boulevard in Focșani, Romania. It is dedicated to the Twelve Apostles.

Located in the northern part of the city, the church was built by the inhabitants of the Ocol and Arion quarters. Work began in 1850, during the reign of Grigore Alexandru Ghica, Prince of Moldavia. Progress had stagnated by 1861, when additional work was carried out.

The ship-shaped church has a closed porch with a spire on each side, a narthex, nave and altar. The spire on the north side contains a wooden spiral staircase. The interior ceiling features semi-spherical vaults. The facades are not decorated. The entrance has a semicircular arch. There are five rectangular niches below the altar cornice.

The church is listed as a historic monument by Romania's Ministry of Culture and Religious Affairs.
