= Holy Apostles' Church, Hoshtevë =

Cultural monument of Albania

Holy Apostles' Church
- Kisha e Shën Apostujve (Albanian)
- Interactive map of Holy Apostles' Church
- 40.2176°N 20.2482°E
- Location: Hoshtevë, Gjirokastër County

Cultural Monument of Albania

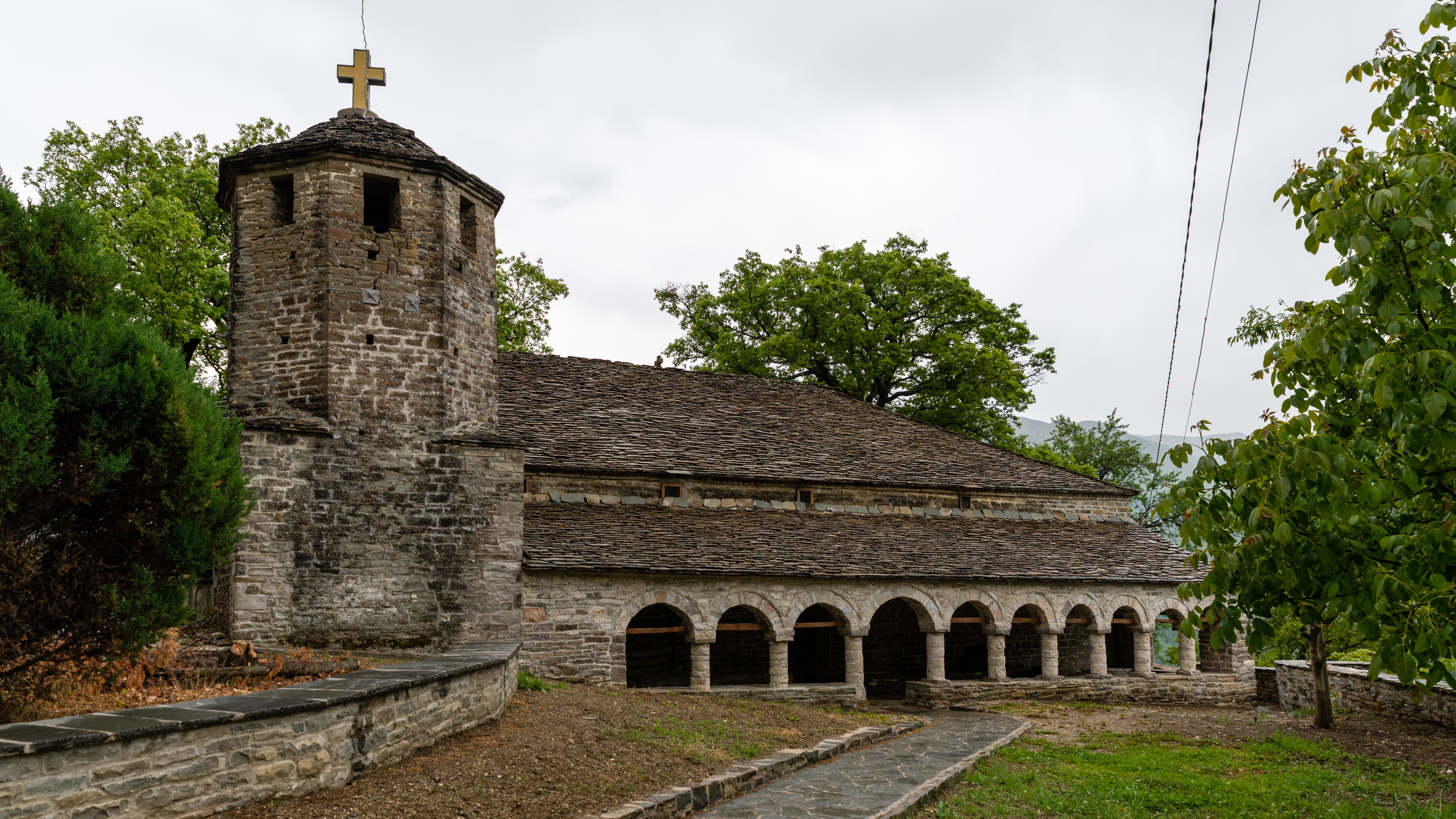
Holy Apostles' Church, Hoshtevë.

Holy Apostles' Church (Albanian: Kisha e Shën Apostujve) is a church in Hoshtevë, Gjirokastër County, Albania. It is a Cultural Monument of Albania.
