= Monastery of the Holy Apostles =

Greek Orthodox monastery in Capernaum, Israel

Church of the Holy Apostles
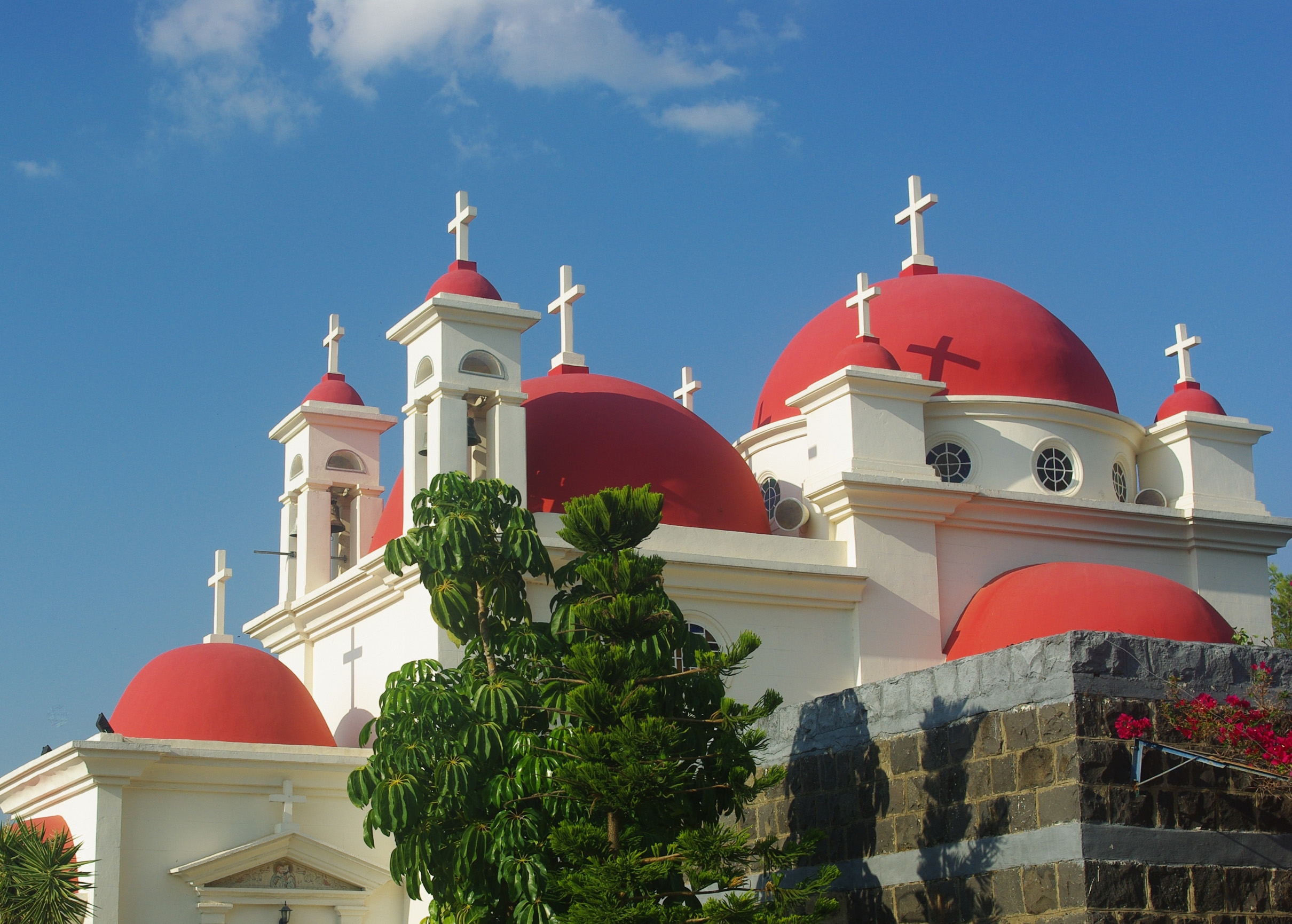

Religion
- Affiliation: Greek Orthodox Patriarchate of Jerusalem
- Region: Middle East
- Leadership: Archimandrite Father Irinarchos

Location
- Location: Capernaum, Israel
- State: Israel
- Interactive map of Church of the Holy Apostles
- Coordinates: 32.760889°N 35.362486°E

Architecture
- Completed: 1931
- Dome: 7

The Greek Orthodox Church of the Holy Apostles, in common use simply Church of the Apostles (Hebrew: כנסיית השליחים, Knessiath haShlichim) is the church at the centre of the Greek Orthodox Monastery of the Holy Apostles at Capernaum, standing among the ruins of ancient Capernaum (Kfar Nachum) near the shore of the Sea of Galilee in Israel. It is also known as simply the Greek Orthodox church at Capernaum, to differentiate it from the Franciscan monastery standing in the southern part of Capernaum. It is sometimes named as the Church of the Seven Apostles, based on the seven disciples mentioned in John 21 (John 21:1–2), but it is actually dedicated to all the twelve apostles of Jesus.

== Significance ==
The church marks the site of the ancient village of Capernaum, which is an important place in Christianity. The village is frequently mentioned in the Gospels and was Jesus' main base during his Galilean ministry. It is referred to as Jesus' own city and a place where he lived. It was in the synagogue of Capernaum where he first started to preach.

Those who claim that the church is dedicated the seven apostles (or rather five apostles and two more disciples), base it on the Gospel of John, chapter 21. The church is actually dedicated to all twelve apostles, which also make sense due to the long stay of Jesus and his closest disciples in Capernaum.

== History ==
The monastery was founded at the beginning of the 20th Century on a site acquired by the Jerusalem Patriarchate. This church was built as part of the monastery complex in 1925. In the 1980s, the church was completely rebuilt; only the 1931 stone iconostasis was preserved from the former church. In 1995-2000, the church was painted by the Greek artist Konstantin Dzumakis. The walls of the church depict gospel scenes, many of which took place in Capernaum and its environs: the calming of the storm, Jesus walking on water, the amazing catch of fish from John 21, and Jesus healing the sick.

== Location ==
The church is situated in the more recent, north-eastern part of the ruined ancient town, which is where the inhabitants relocated after the destruction of the old town from the time of Jesus, as a result of either the 749 Galilee earthquake or of a man-made event of the 7th or 8th century.
