= Chapel of the Apostles =

Seminary chapel in Sewanee, Tennessee, United States

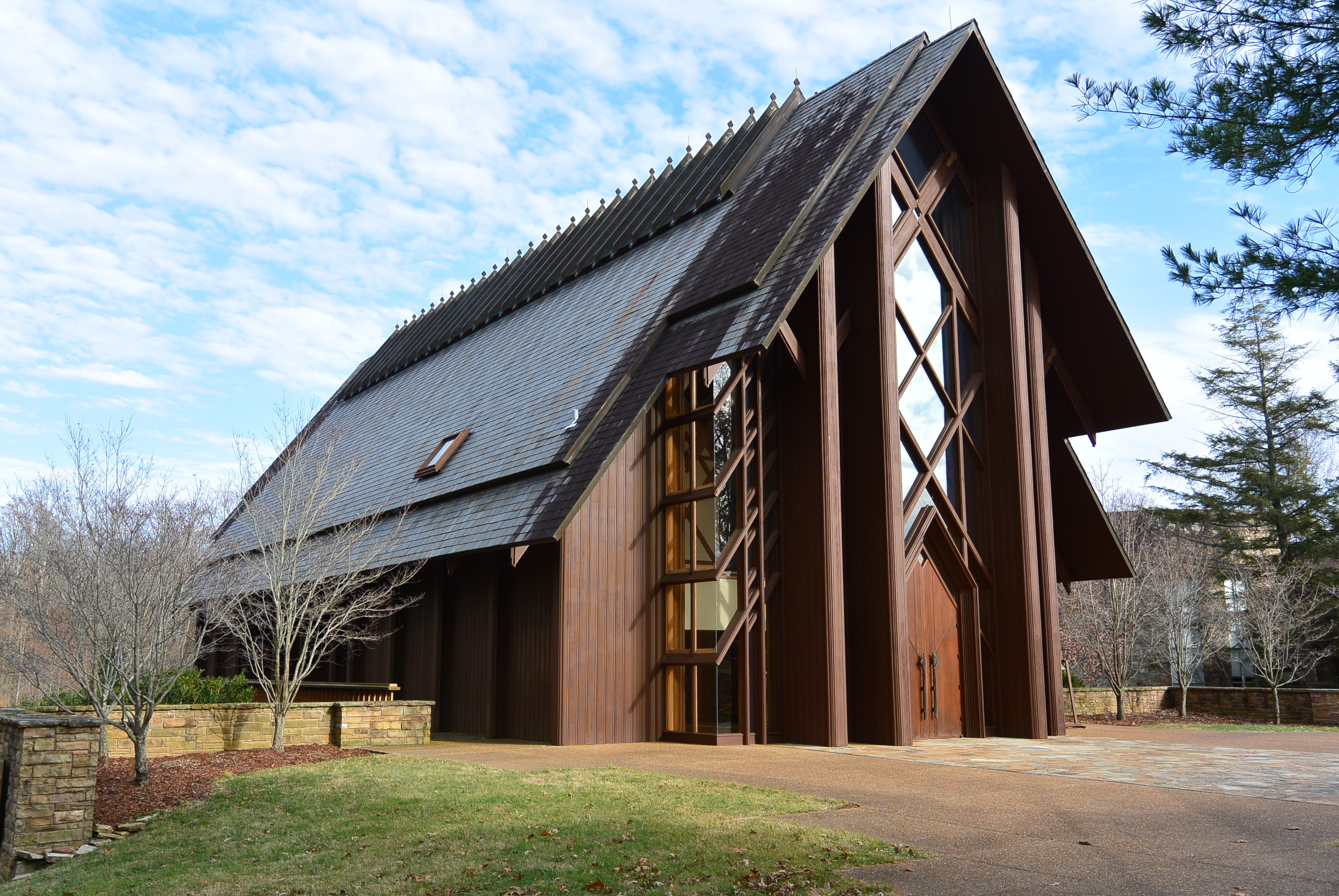
- The Chapel of the Apostles in 2026
- Chapel of the Apostles
- 35.1981°N 85.9242°W
- Location: Sewanee, Tennessee
- Country: United States
- Denomination: Episcopalian

Architecture
- Architect: Maurice Jennings
- Architectural type: Organic architecture
- Completed: 2000
- Construction cost: $4.5 million ($8.41 million in 2025)

Specifications
- Capacity: 250

The Chapel of the Apostles is an Episcopal chapel in Sewanee, Tennessee, United States, where it serves the School of Theology at the University of the South. Designed by Maurice Jennings, a former associate of E. Fay Jones, it has similarities to Jones' chapel projects. The chapel is considered a work of "organic architecture" through its use of natural light and wooden crossbeam trusses. It was designed as both a space for worship and a place of liturgical instruction for seminarians. The chapel was dedicated in 2000 and won several regional awards.

== History ==
The chapel was commissioned for the School of Theology at Sewanee to serve the functional requirements of teaching seminarians to lead liturgical worship, as well as to provide an uplifting environment for worship. Its construction cost was $4.5 million ($8.41 million in 2025). The chapel was dedicated in 2000.

== Architecture ==
The chapel was designed by Maurice Jennings of Maurice Jennings + David McKee Architects, which had been the firm of E. Fay Jones prior to 1997. Jones was the architect of Thorncrown Chapel and the Mildred B. Cooper Memorial Chapel (the latter co-designed with Jennings), and the "organic architecture" of the Chapel of the Apostles—featuring natural light, a high and vaulted ceiling and an airy feeling produced by the arrangement of wooden crossbeams—reflected Jones' continued influence on Jennings' work. The architecture was also intended to be a contemporary evocation of traditional Episcopal Church architecture.

The chapel includes a narthex, nave and chancel, with an organ loft above a sacristy and smaller reconciliation chapel. The ceiling features visible cross-bracing trusses and large panels of glass on the walls, as well as a skylight, allowing natural light into the building.

The 9,500-square-foot (880 m^{2}) chapel's nave has a capacity of 250 worshipers. It is located adjacent to Hamilton Hall, the School of Theology's main building, with a courtyard connecting the two spaces.

== Reception ==
The chapel received an honor award from the Arkansas chapter of the American Institute of Architects, an honor citation from the Gulf States Region of the AIA, and an excellence award from the Middle Tennessee chapter of the AIA. Southern Living magazine described it as one the South's most beautiful chapels and said that "through its creative interplay of cross-bracing trusses and sheets of geometrically shaped glass, this intricate structure calls to mind a multifaceted diamond."

== Gallery ==
Chapel of the Apostles gallery
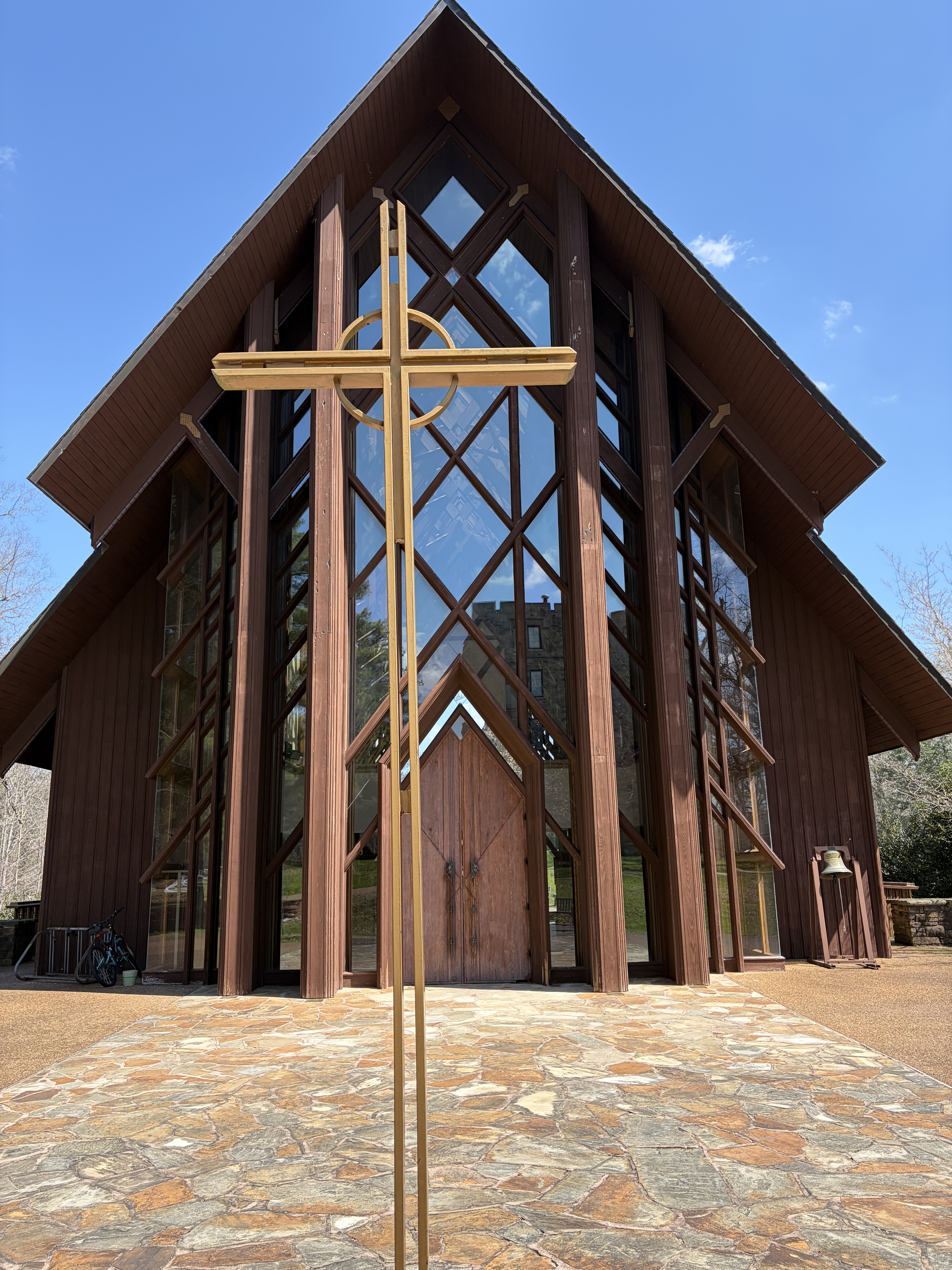
Chapel entrance

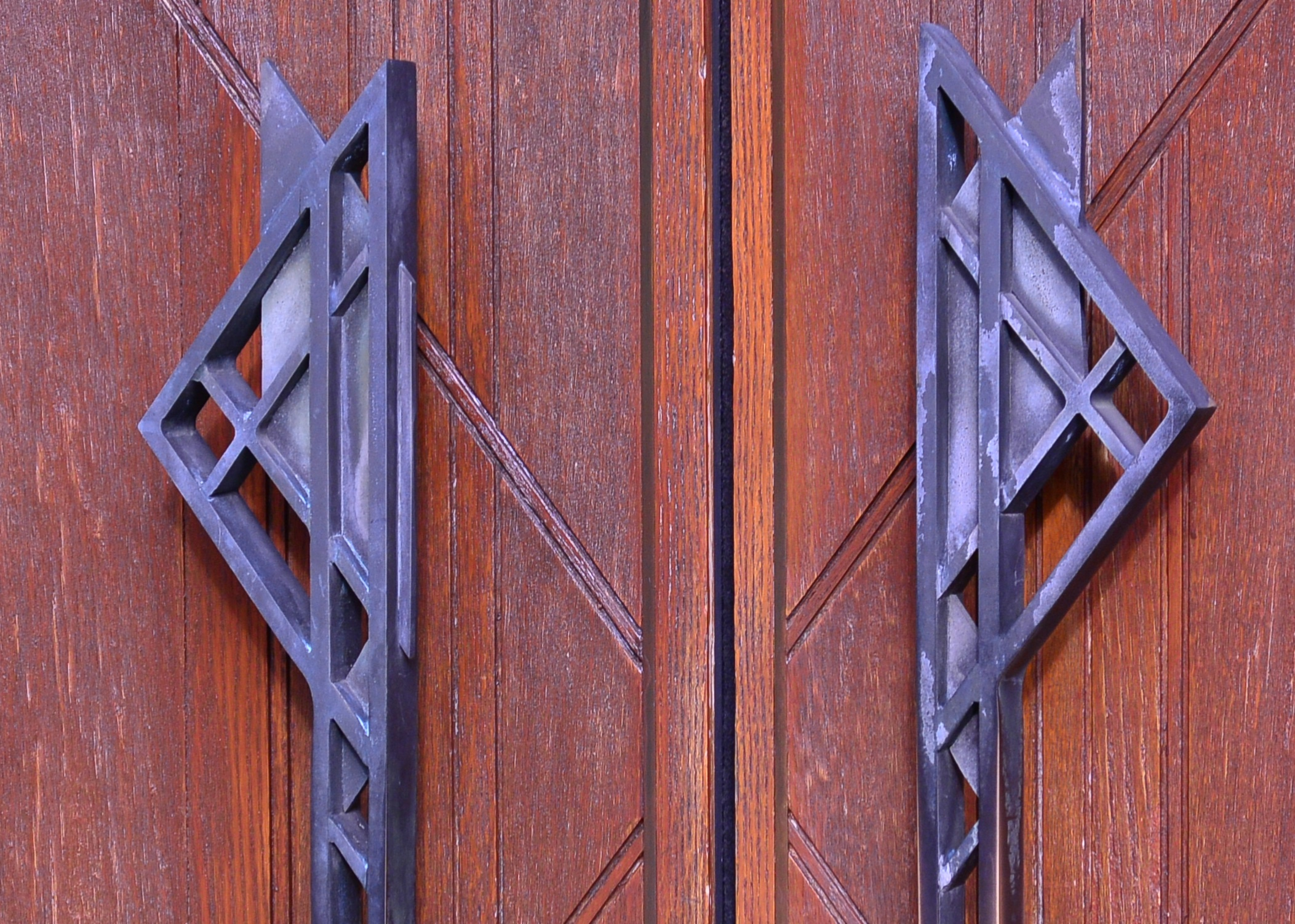
Door handles

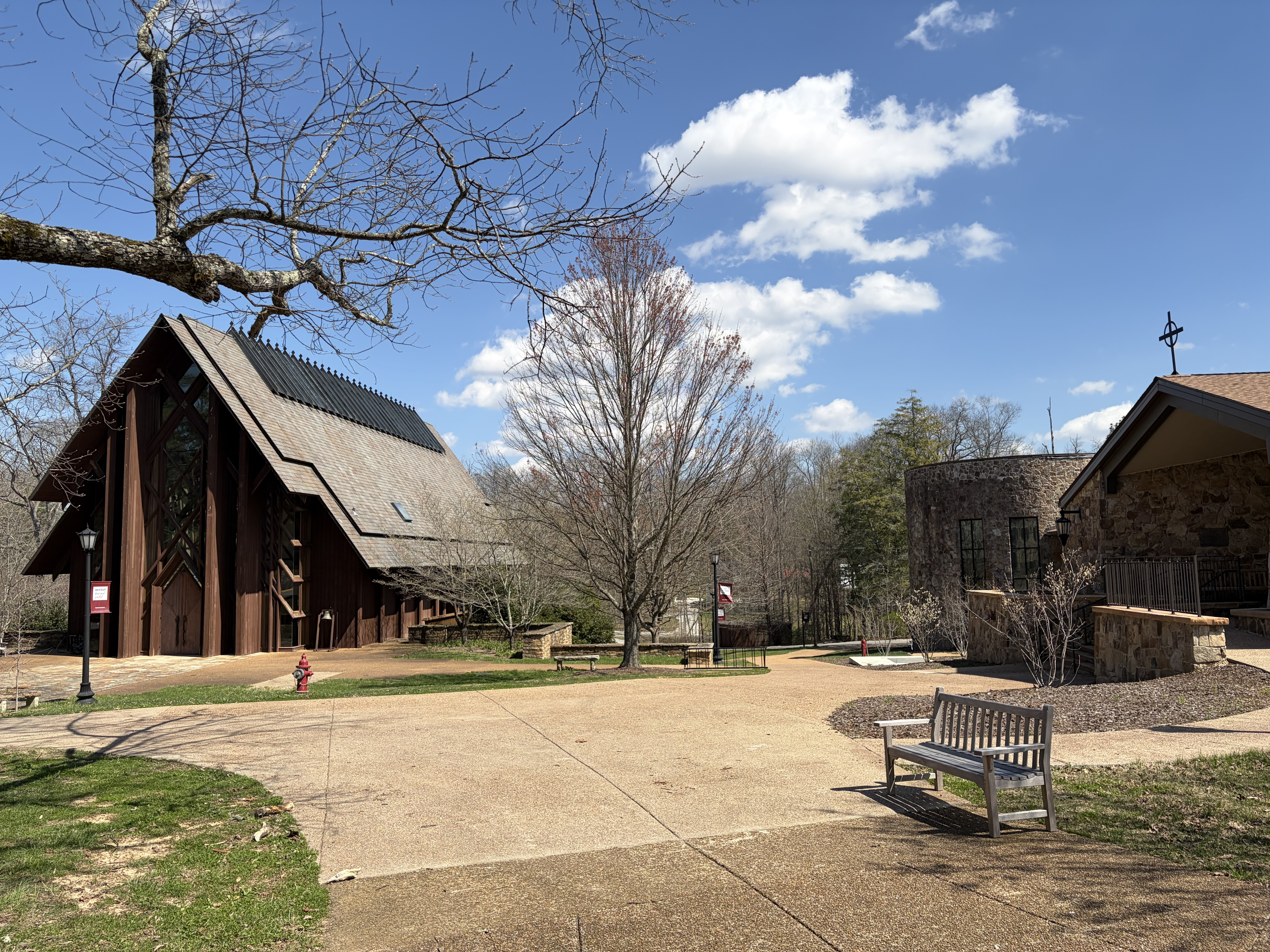
Courtyard outside Hamilton Hall

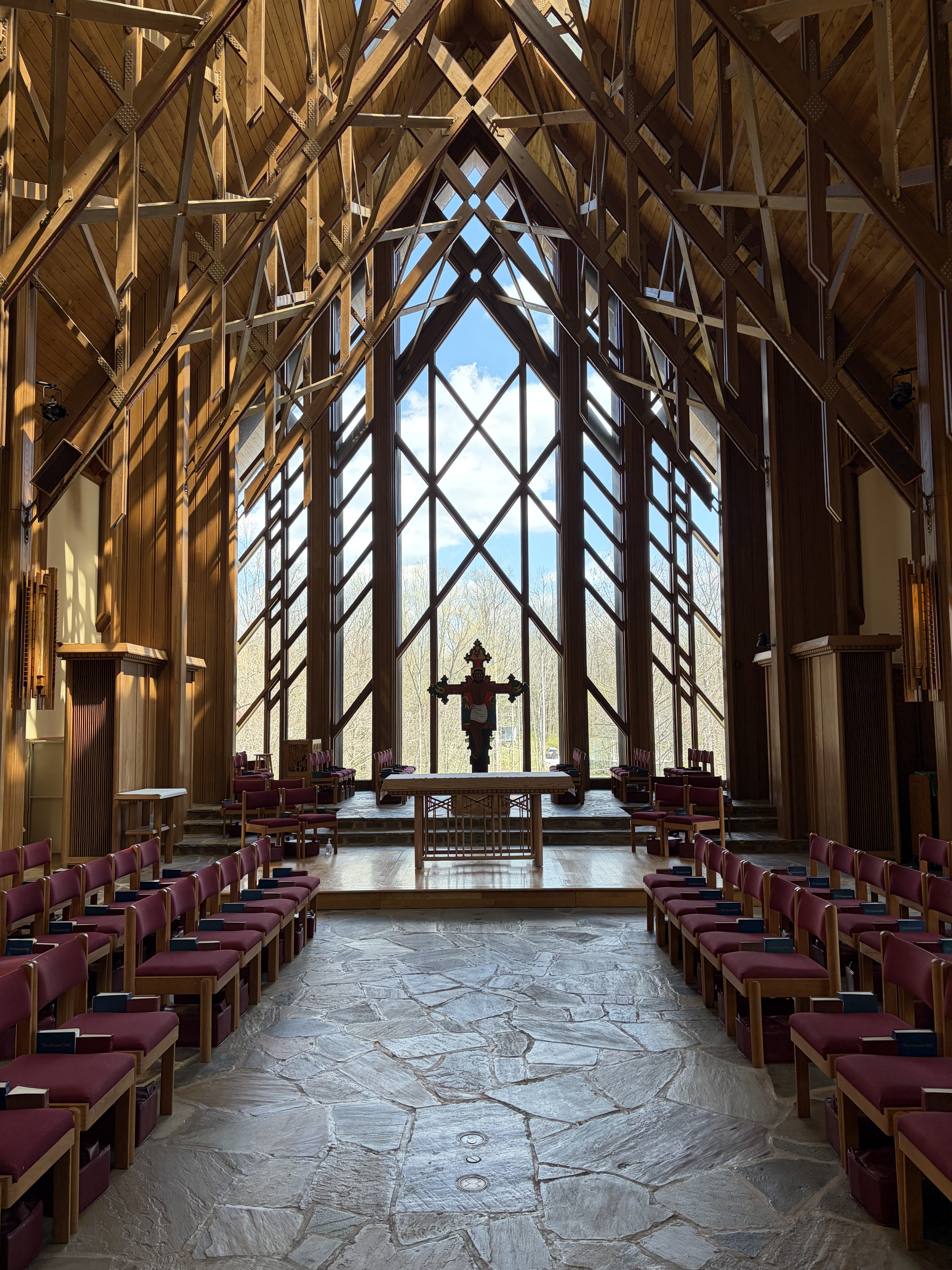
Chapel nave, looking toward the chancel

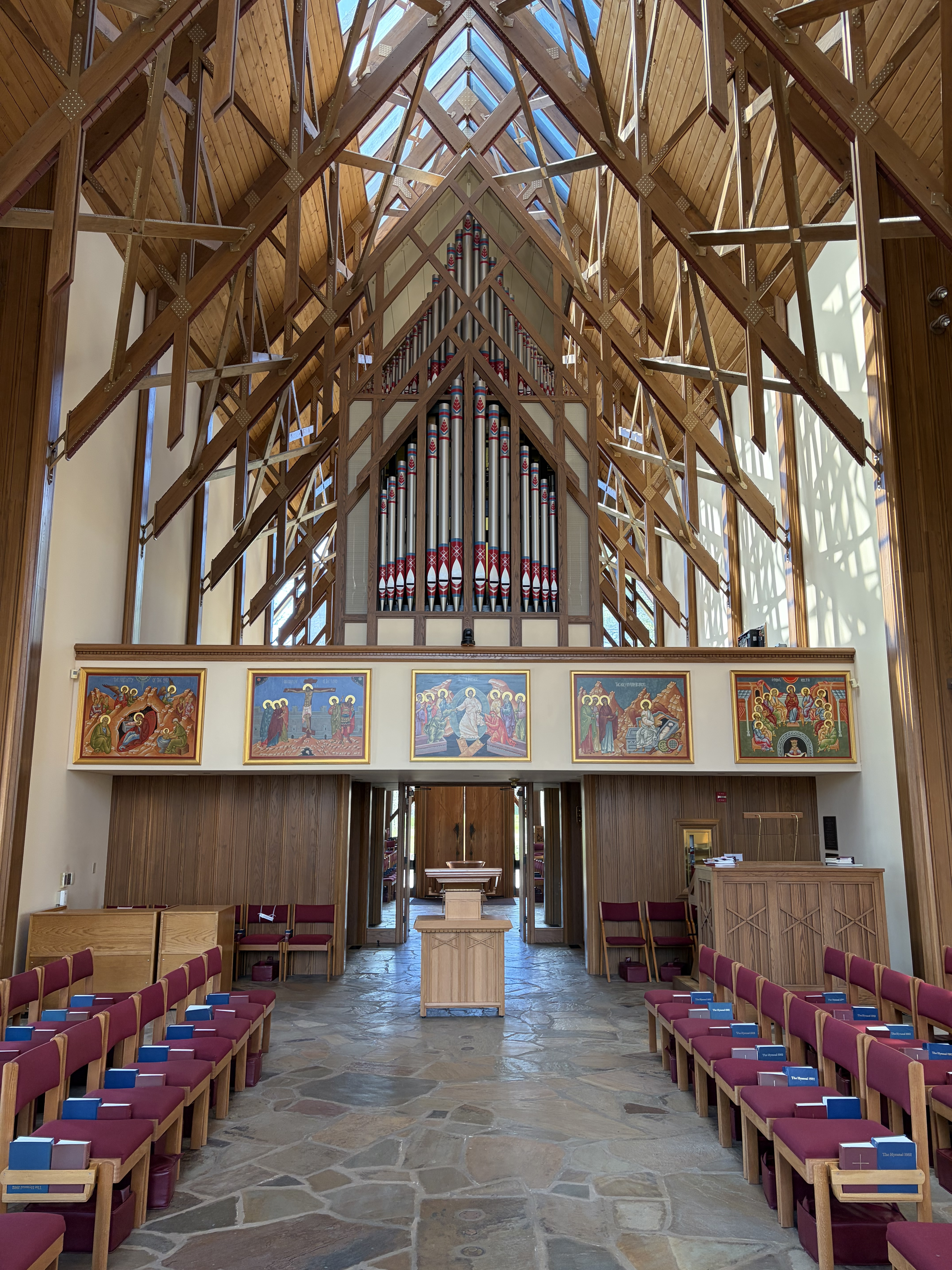
Chapel nave, looking toward the narthex and organ loft

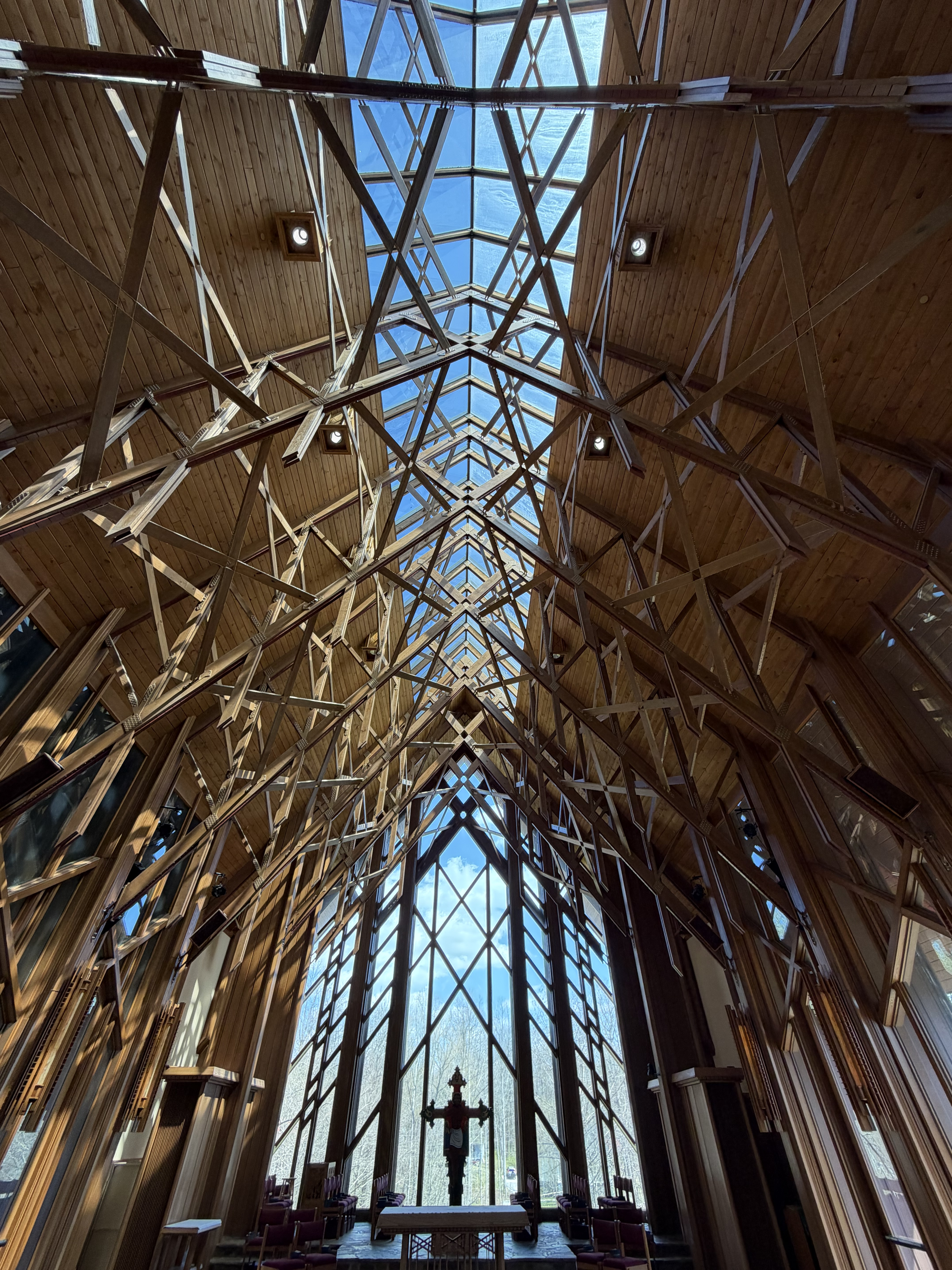
Chapel nave, looking up toward the skylight

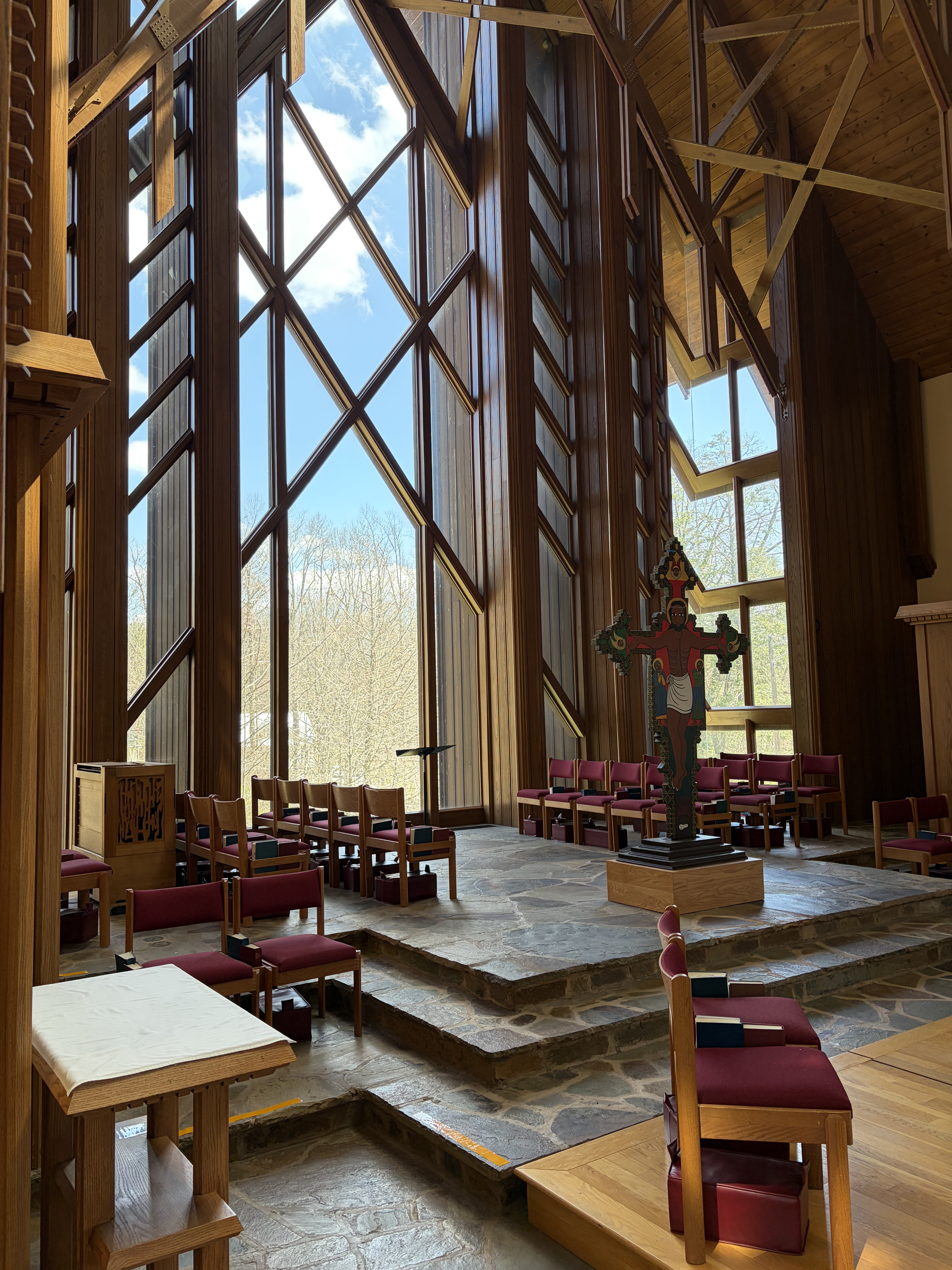
Chancel area

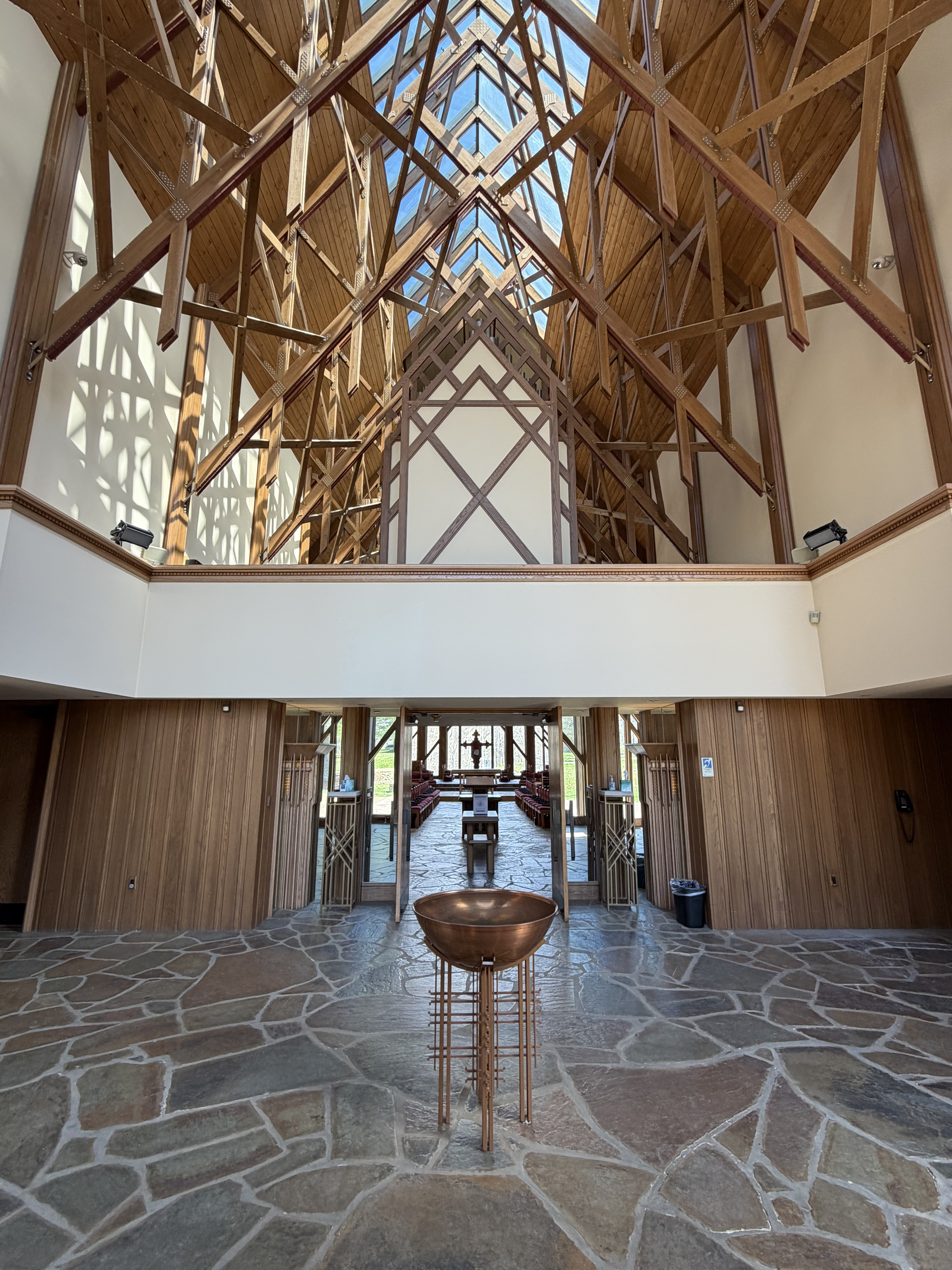
Baptismal font in the narthex
