= Capernaum =

Village at Lake Tiberias in historical Judea

- כְּפַר נַחוּם (Hebrew) (Kǝfar Naḥūm)
- Kapharnaum, Kepharnōkón, Kafr Nāḥūm, Talḥūm
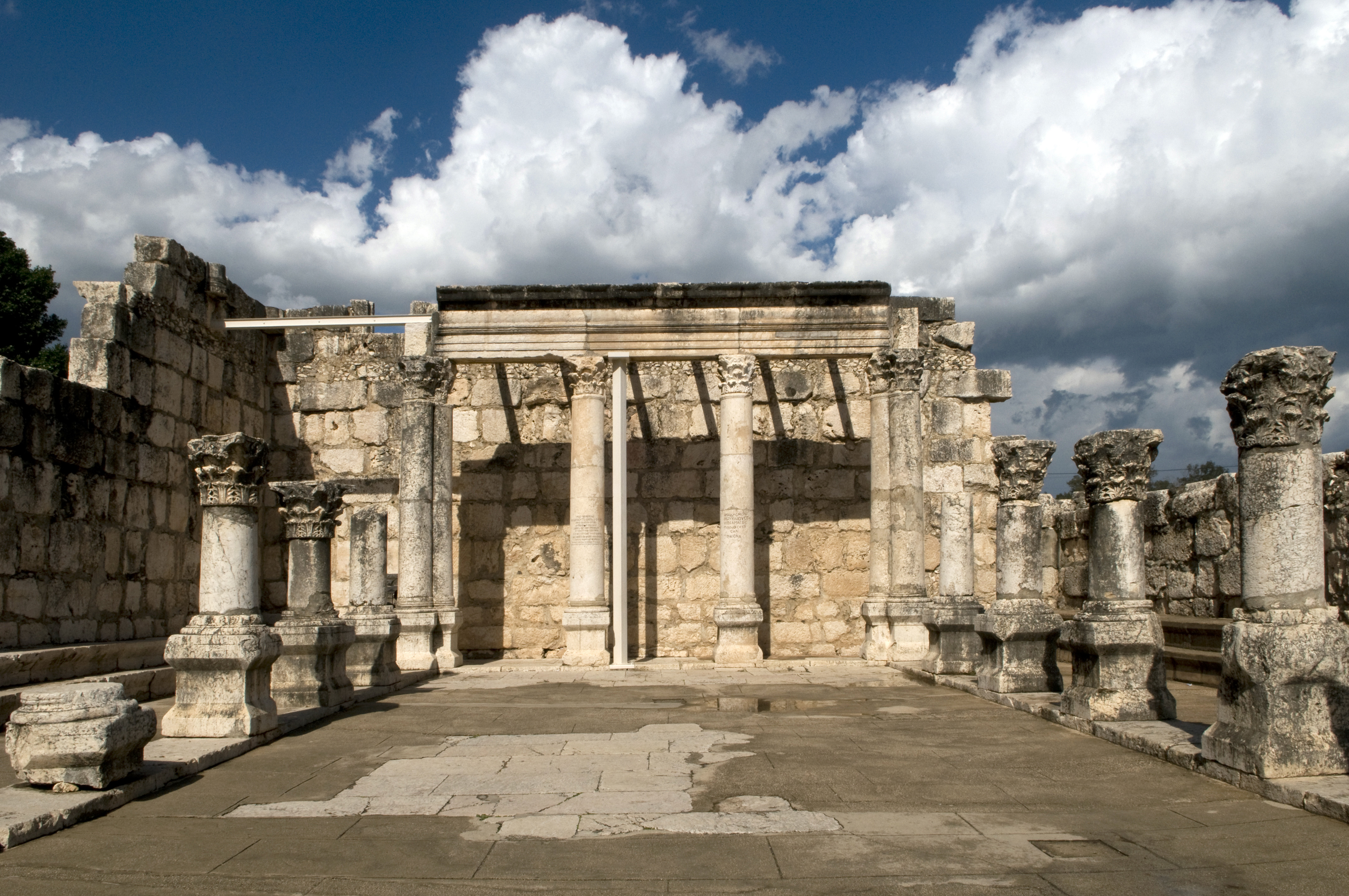
- Ruins of the 4th-century Capernaum synagogue

- Location within Israel
- 32°52′52″N 35°34′30″E
- Type: Settlement
- Periods: Hasmonean, Roman, Byzantine, early Islamic periods
- Cultures: Jewish (Second Temple and Talmudic eras), Christian
- Location: Plain of Ginosar, Sea of Galilee, Israel
- Region: Galilee

Site notes
- Excavation dates: 1838–present
- Archaeologists: Edward Robinson, Charles William Wilson, Heinrich Kohl, Carl Watzinger, Vendelin von Benden, Gaudenzio Orfali, Virgilio Corbo, Stanislao Loffreda, Vassilios Tzaferis
- Condition: Partially preserved
- Public access: Yes
- Website: Capernaum – Custody of the Holy Land

Capernaum (/kəˈpɜːrneɪəm, -niəm/ kə-PUR-nay-əm, -nee-əm; Hebrew: כְּפַר נַחוּם, romanized: Kfar Naḥum, lit. 'Nahum's village'; Arabic: كَفْرْ نَاحُومْ, romanized: Kafr Nāḥūm) was a fishing village established during the time of the Hasmoneans in Israel, located on the northern shore of the Sea of Galilee. It had a population of about 1,500 in the 1st century AD. Archaeological excavations have revealed two ancient synagogues built successively at the same spot. A house progressively turned into a church during the 4th and 5th centuries is held by Christian tradition to have been the home of Saint Peter.

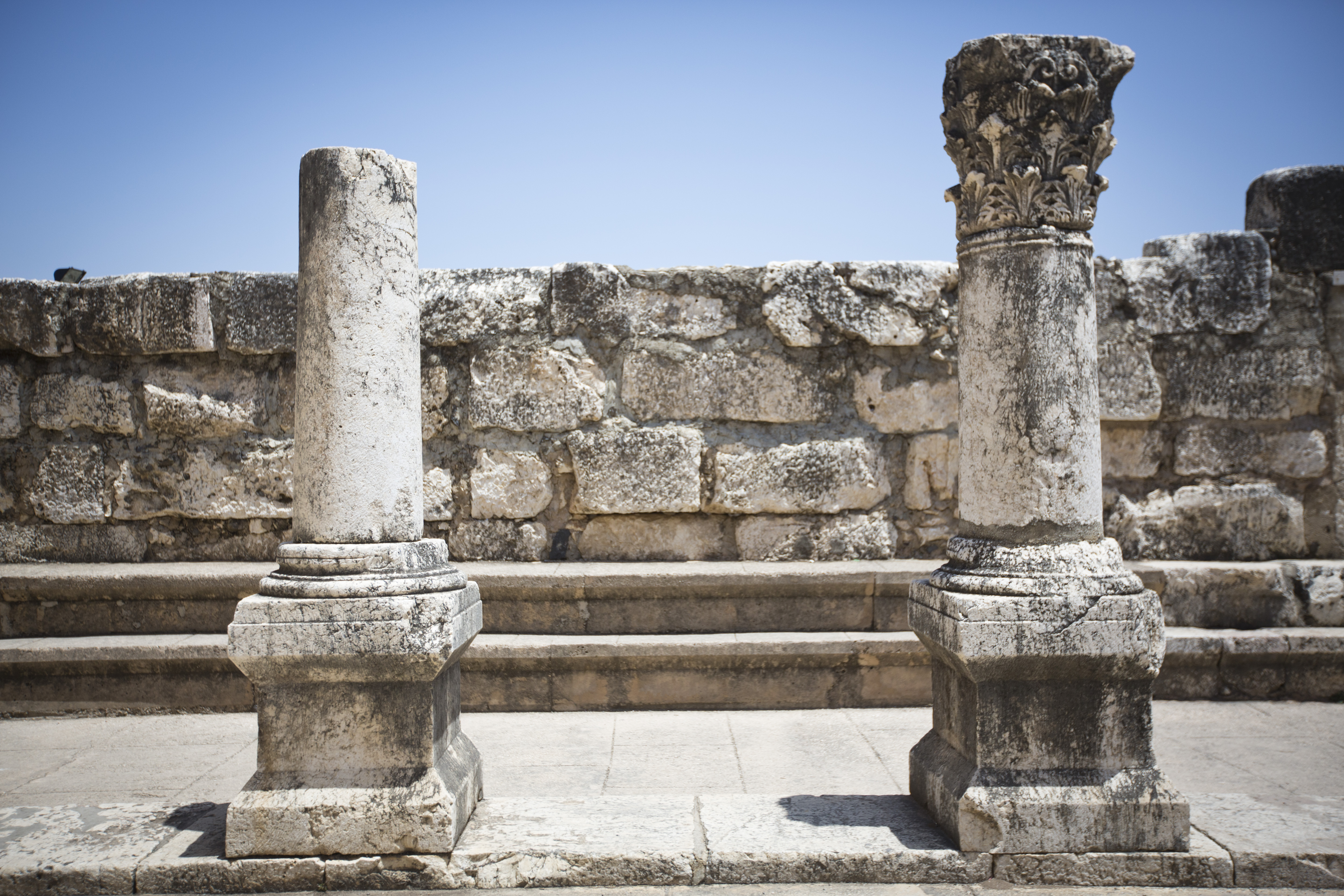
Capernaum's 4th-century synagogue (detail with columns and benches)

The village was inhabited continuously from the 2nd century BC to the 11th century AD, when it was abandoned sometime before the First Crusade. This includes the re-establishment of the village northeast of the earlier location in c. 700, during the Early Islamic period.

== Toponymy ==
Kfar Naḥum, the original name of the town, means "village of comfort" in Hebrew, and apparently there is no connection with the prophet named Nahum. In the writings of Josephus, the name is rendered in Koine Greek as Kαφαρναούμ (Kapharnaoúm) and Κεφαρνωκόν (Kepharnōkón); the New Testament uses Kapharnaoúm in some manuscripts, and Kαπερναούμ (Kapernaoúm) in others. In the Midrash Rabba (Ecclesiastes Rabba 7:47) the name appears in its Hebrew form, Kǝfar Naḥūm (Hebrew: כפר נחום). In Arabic, it is called Talḥūm, and it is assumed that this refers to the ruin (tall) of Ḥūm (perhaps an abbreviated form of Nāḥūm).

The rare English word capharnaum means "a place with a disorderly accumulation of objects" and is derived from the town's name.

== New Testament ==
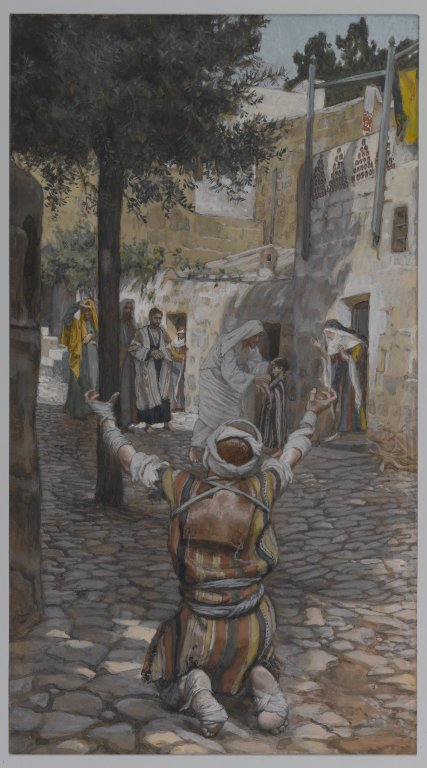
James Tissot – Healing of the Lepers at Capernaum (Guérison des lépreux à Capernaum) – Brooklyn Museum

Capernaum is cited in all four gospels (Matthew 4:13, 8:5, 11:23, 17:24, Mark 1:21, 2:1, 9:33, Luke 4:23,31, 7:1, 10:15, John 2:12, 4:46, 6:17, 24, 59) where it was reported to have been the hometown of the tax collector Matthew and located not far from Bethsaida, the hometown of the apostles Simon Peter, Andrew, James and John. Jesus spent time teaching and healing there. On a Sabbath day, Jesus taught in the synagogue in Capernaum and healed a man who was possessed by an unclean spirit (Luke 4:31–36 and Mark 1:21–28). This story is notable as the only one that is common to the gospels of Mark and Luke but not contained in the Gospel of Matthew. Afterward, Jesus healed Simon Peter's mother-in-law of a fever (Luke 4:38–39). According to Luke 7:1–10 and Matthew 8:5, this is also the place where Jesus healed the servant of a Roman centurion who had asked for his help. Capernaum is the location of the healing of the paralytic lowered by friends through the roof to reach Jesus, as described in Mark 2:1–12 and Luke 5:17–26.

In Matthew 9:1 the town is referred to only as "his own city", and the narrative in Matthew 9:2–7 does not mention the paralytic being lowered through the roof. Most traditional biblical commentators (e.g. Bengel, Benson and the Jamieson-Fausset-Brown Bible Commentary) assume that in Matthew 9:1–7 "his own city" means Capernaum, because of the details that are common to the three Synoptic Gospels.

According to the Synoptic Gospels, Jesus selected this town as the center of his public ministry in Galilee after he left the small mountainous hamlet of Nazareth (Matthew 4:12–17). He cursed Capernaum, along with Bethsaida and Chorazin, saying "you will be thrown down to Hades!" (Matthew 11:23) because of their apparent lack of faith in him.

== History ==
Archaeological evidence demonstrates that the town was established in the 2nd century BC during the Hasmonean period, when several fishing villages sprang up around the lake. The site had no defensive wall and extended along the northwestern shore of the lake. The cemetery zone is found 200 meters (660 ft) north of the synagogue, which places it beyond the inhabited area of the town. The historic site of Capernaum is 2.5 kilometers (1.6 mi) from Tabgha, an area which appears to have been used for agricultural purposes, judging by the many oil and grain mills which were discovered in the excavation. Fishing was a major source of income; the remains of an ancient harbor were found to the west of the modern one built by the Franciscans.

No sources have been found for the belief that Capernaum was involved in the bloody Jewish revolts against the Romans, the First Jewish–Roman War (AD 66–73) or Bar Kokhba's revolt (132–135), although there is reason to believe that Josephus, one of the Jewish generals during the earlier revolt, was taken to Capernaum (which he called Κεφαρνωκόν, Kepharnōkón) after a fall from his horse in nearby Bethsaida. Josephus refers to Capernaum as a fertile spring (Wars – Book III, 10, 8).

As early as AD 530, Capernaum was mentioned in the writings of Theodosius the archdeacon who said that it was situated, as one goes northward from Tiberias, two miles from Tabgha (Heptapegon) and six miles short of Bethsaida along the same route.

The town was abandoned in the 11th century. The Greek Orthodox Monastery of the Holy Apostles and its church were built there in 1931.

== Archaeology ==
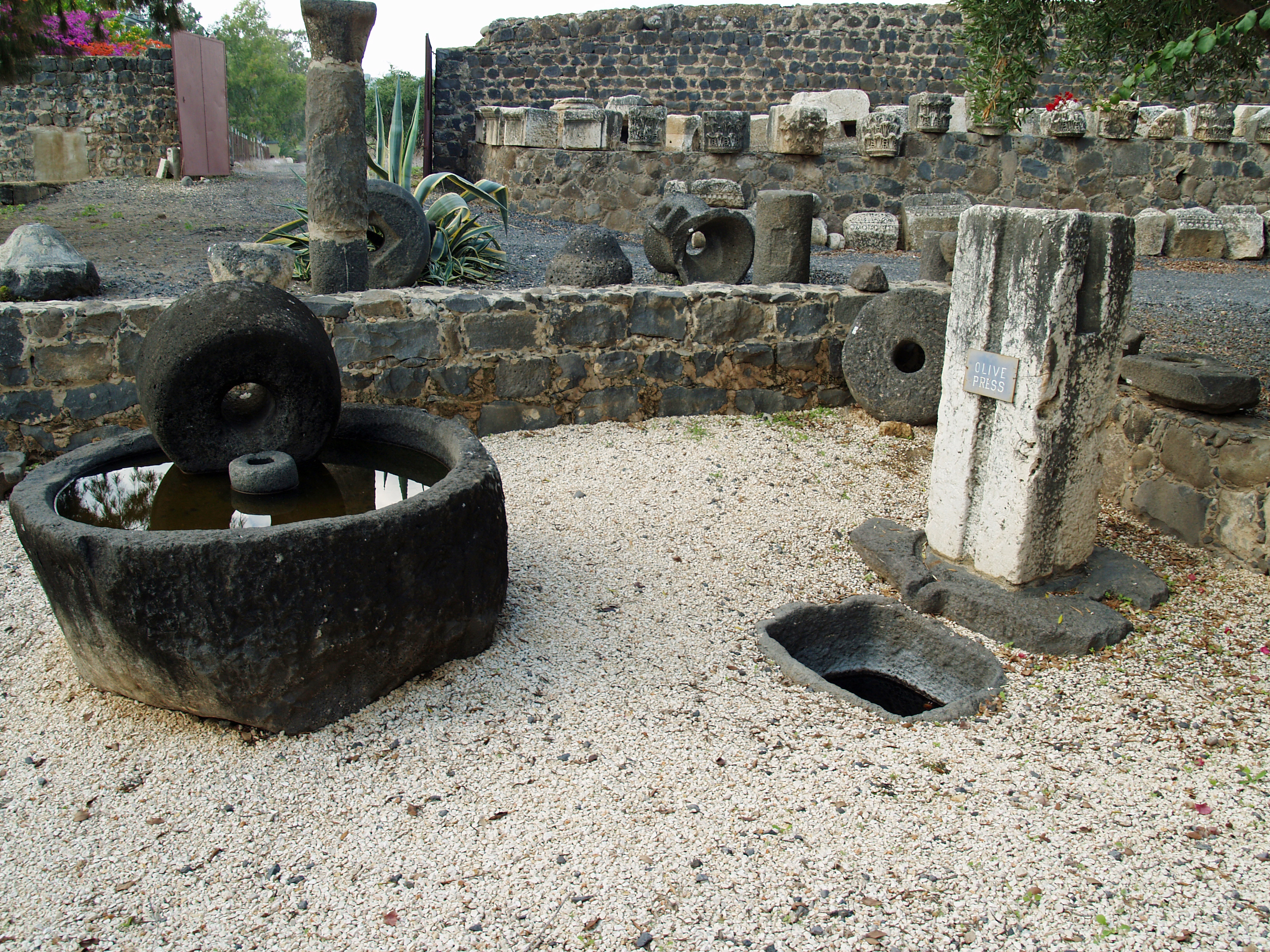
Olive press from Roman times, different elements

=== Discovery and excavation ===
In 1838, American explorer Edward Robinson discovered ruins which he identified as those of a synagogue, but he did not relate this to ancient Capernaum. In 1866, Charles William Wilson identified the location as Capernaum, then known in Arabic as Tell Hum. In 1894, Franciscan Friar Giuseppe Baldi of Naples, the Custodian of the Holy Land, was able to purchase a good part of the land around the ruins. Additional land on the eastern portion of the site became the property of the Greek Orthodox Patriarchate of Jerusalem.

In 1905, Germans Heinrich Kohl and Carl Watzinger began a study of Galilean synagogues. These were continued by the Franciscan Fathers Vendelin von Benden (1905–1915) and Gaudenzio Orfali (1921–1926). The excavations resulted in the discovery of two public buildings, the synagogue (which was partially restored by Orfali) and an octagonal church.

In 1968, excavation of the western portion of the site—the portion owned by the Franciscans—was resumed by Virgilio Corbo and Stanislao Loffreda. During this phase, the major discovery was that of a 1st-century house which is believed by Christians to be the home of Saint Peter. These excavations have continued until at least 2003. The excavations revealed that the settlement was established in the 2nd century BC, and abandoned in the 11th century.

The eastern half of the site, which is owned by the Orthodox Monastery of the Holy Apostles, centered on the red-domed Church of the Holy Apostles, was surveyed and partially excavated under the direction of Vassilios Tzaferis. This section has uncovered the village from the Byzantine and Early Arab periods. Excavations have uncovered a pool apparently used for the processing of fish, and a hoard of gold coins.

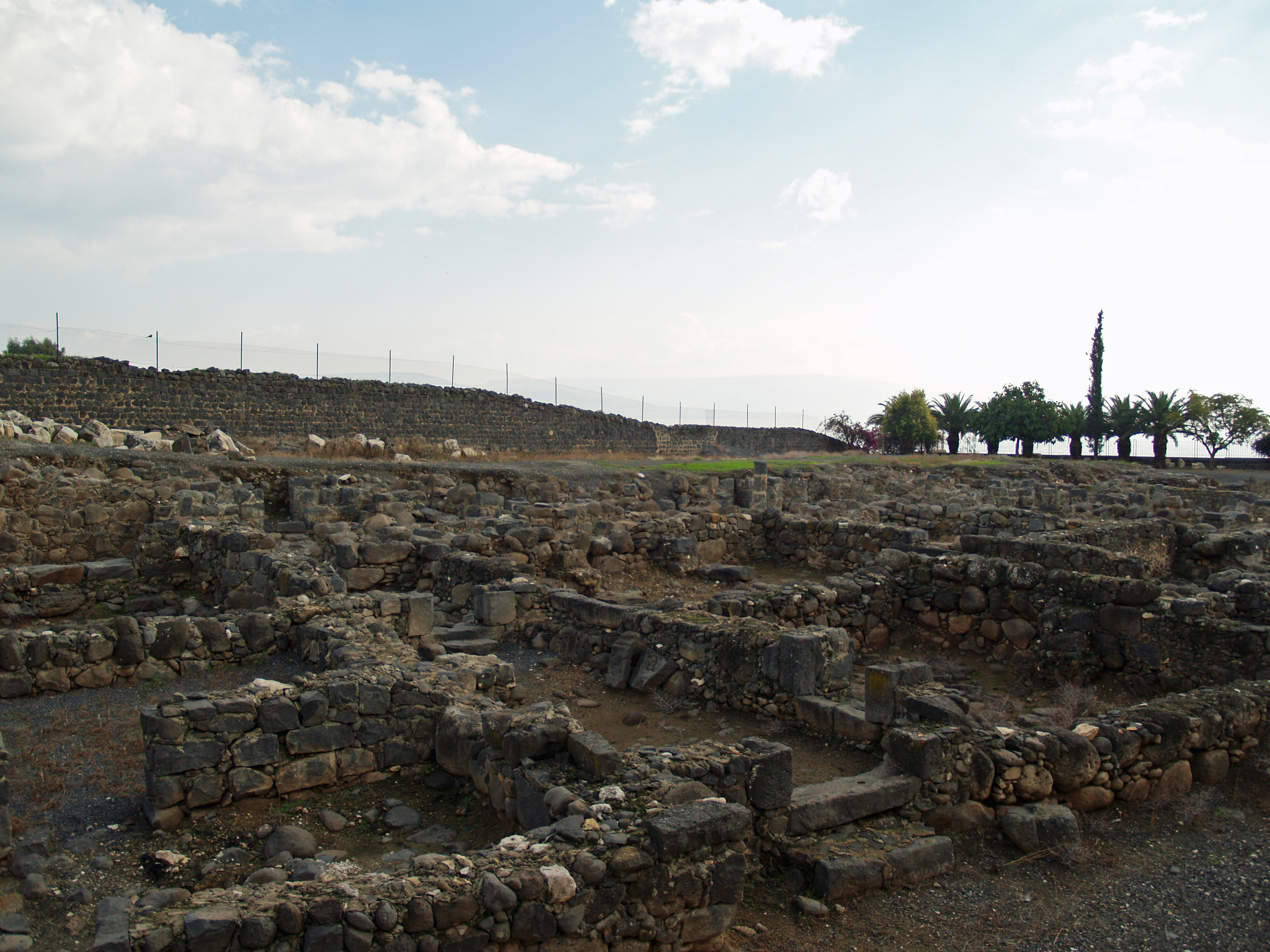
Ruins of the Roman-period town

=== General description ===
On both sides of an ample north–south main street arose small districts bordered by small cross-sectional streets and no-exit side-streets. The walls were constructed with coarse basalt blocks and reinforced with stone and mud, but the stones (except for the thresholds) were not dressed, and mortar was not used.

The most extensive part of the typical house was the courtyard, where there was a circular furnace made of refractory earth, as well as grain mills and a set of stone stairs that led to the roof. The floors of the houses were cobbled. Around the open courtyard, modest cells were arranged which received light through a series of openings or low windows. Given the coarse construction of the walls, there was rarely a second story to a typical home, and the roof would have been constructed of light wooden beams and thatch mixed with mud. This, along with the discovery of stairs to the roof, recalls the story of the Healing of the Paralytic from Mark 2:4: "And when they could not come nigh unto him for the press, they uncovered the roof where he was: and when they had broken it up, let down the bed wherein the sick of the palsy lay".

A study of the district located between the synagogue and the octagonal church showed that several extended families clustered together, communally using the same courtyards and doorless internal passages. The houses had no hygienic facilities or drainage; the rooms were narrow. Most objects found were made of clay: pots, plates, amphoras, and lamps. Fish hooks, weights for fish nets, striker pins, weaving bobbins, and basalt mills for milling grain and pressing olives were also found.

As of the 4th century, the houses were constructed with good quality mortar and fine ceramics. This was about the time that the synagogue now visible was built. Differences in social class were not noticeable. Buildings constructed at the founding of the town continued to be in use until the time of the town's abandonment.

== Synagogue ==
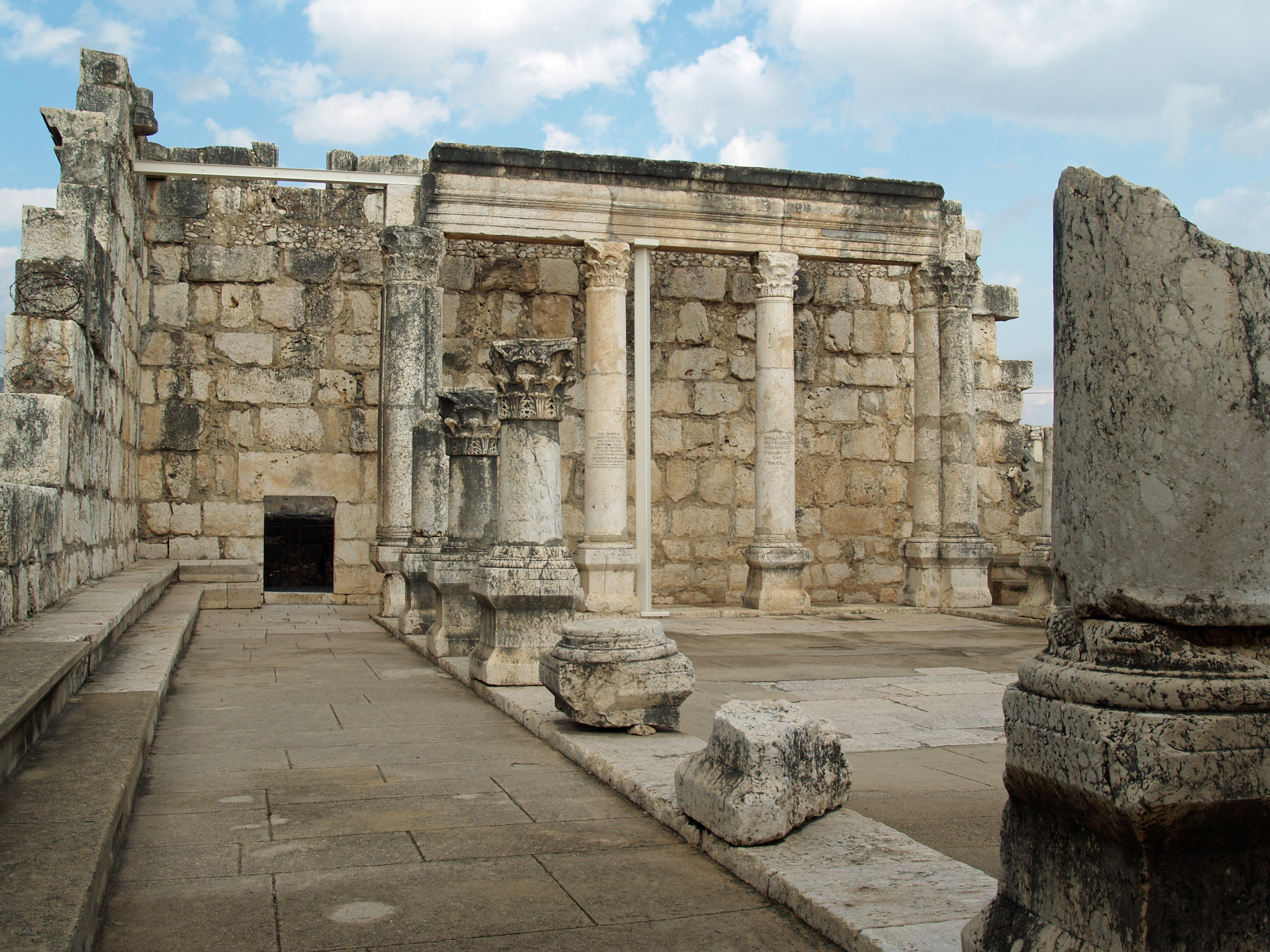
Remains of the 4th-century synagogue

According to Luke's Gospel, the Capernaum synagogue at the time of Jesus' ministry had been built or funded by a Roman centurion based there. The ruins of a later building, among the oldest synagogues in the world, were identified by Wilson. The large, ornately carved, white building stones of the synagogue stood out prominently among the smaller, plain blocks of local black basalt used for the town's other buildings, almost all residential. The synagogue was built almost entirely of white blocks of limestone brought from distant quarries.

The synagogue appears to have been built around the 4th or 5th century. Beneath the foundation of this synagogue lies another foundation made of basalt, and Loffreda suggests that this is the foundation of a synagogue from the 1st century, perhaps the one mentioned in the Gospels. Later excavation work was attempted underneath the synagogue floor, but while Loffreda claimed to have found a paved surface, others are of the opinion that this was an open, paved market area.

The building consists of four parts: the praying hall, the western patio, a southern balustrade and a small room at the northwest of the building. The praying hall measured 24.4 by 18.65 m (80.1 by 61.2 ft), with the southern face looking toward Jerusalem. The internal walls were covered with painted plaster and fine stucco work found during the excavations. Watzinger, like Orfali, believed that there had been an upper floor reserved for women, with access by means of an external staircase located in the small room, but this opinion was not substantiated by the later excavations of the site.

The ancient synagogue has two inscriptions, one in Greek and the other in Aramaic, that commemorate the benefactors that helped in the construction of the building. There are also carvings of five- and six-pointed stars and of palm trees.

In 1926, Orfali began restoration of the synagogue. The work was interrupted by his death in a car accident in 1926 (which is commemorated by a Latin inscription carved onto one of the synagogue's columns), and was continued by Virgilio Corbo beginning in 1976.

== "House of Peter" ==
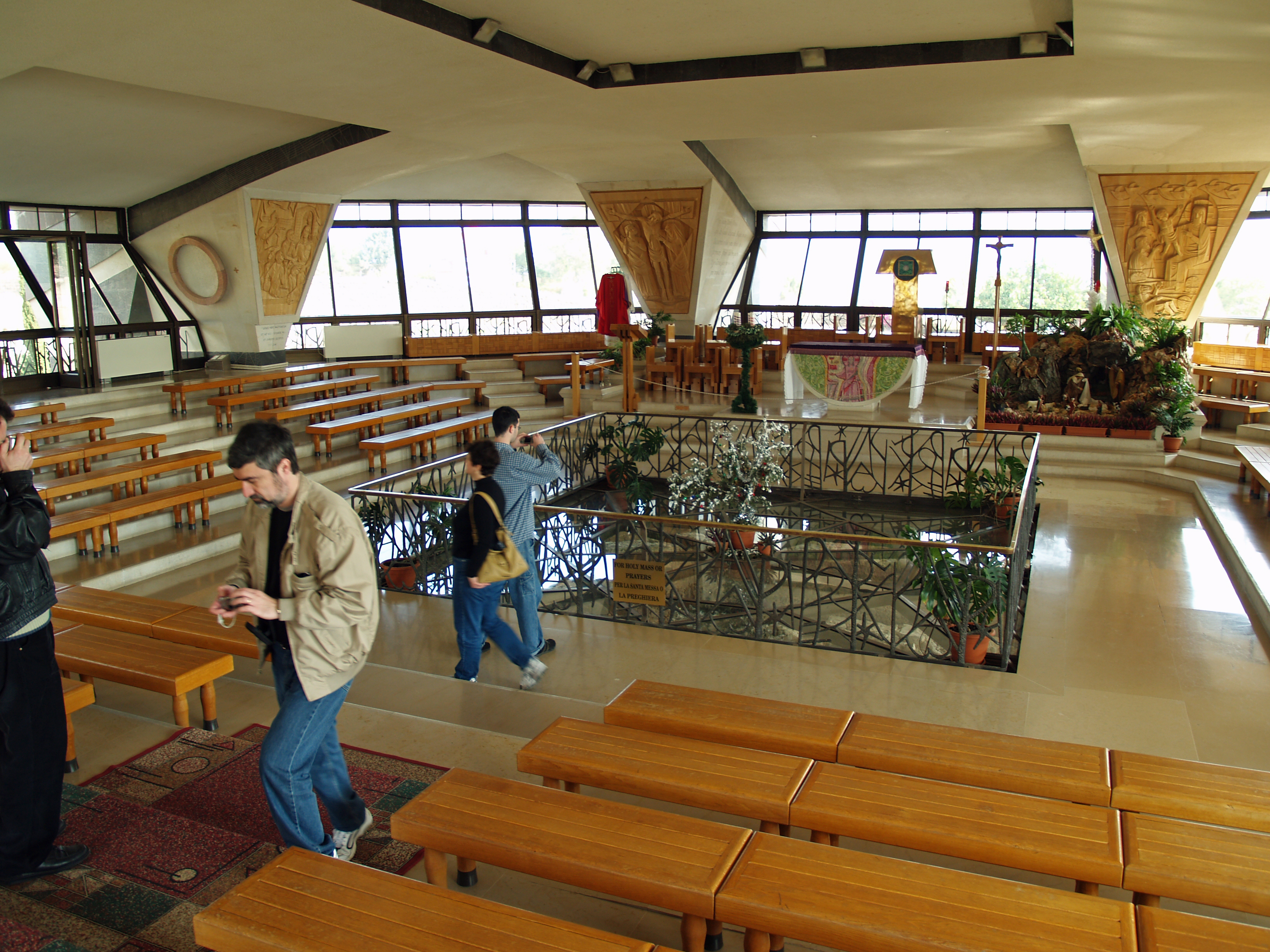
Interior of the modern memorial built over the house of Saint Peter

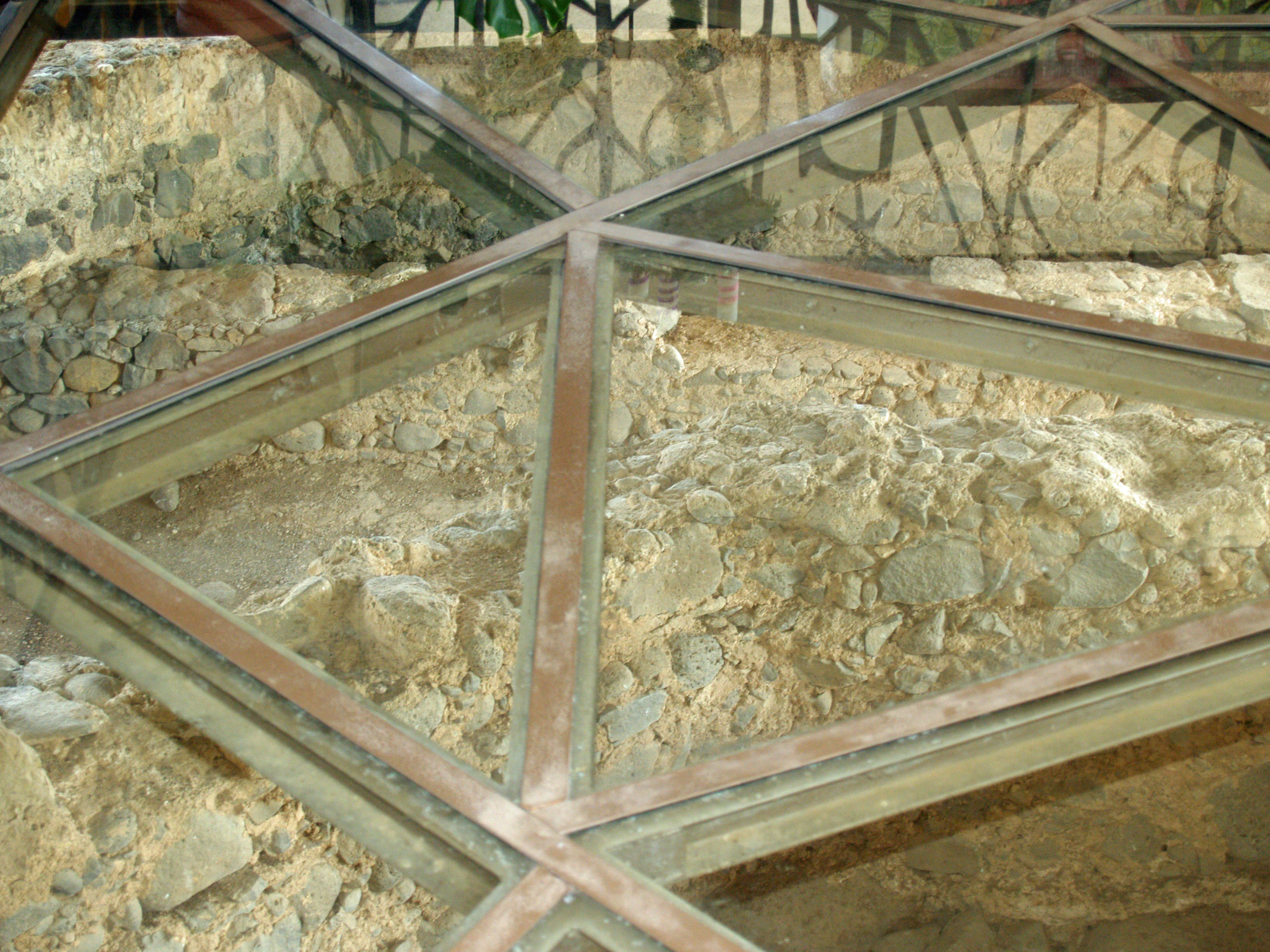
Walls of octagonal 5th-century church, visible through a glass floor

Ancient Capernaum consisted of a grid of typical compounds of a type called by the Franciscan archaeologists "insula" (Latin for island) - a block of homes around a courtyard. One such compound was called by them the sacra insula or "holy insula", which was found to have a complex history. Located between the synagogue and the lake shore, it was found near the front of a labyrinth of houses from many different periods. Three principal layers have been identified:

1. A group of private houses built around the 1st century BC which remained in use until the early 4th century.
2. Renovation of one of the houses in the 4th century.
3. An octagonal church built over that house in the middle of the 5th century.

The excavators concluded that one house in the village was venerated as the house of Peter the fisherman as early as the mid-1st century, with two churches having been constructed over it.

=== 1st century ===
One compound, slightly larger than most, consisted of a few small rooms clustered around two open courtyards, one to the north and the other to the south. One large and roughly square room in particular, near the east side and joining both courtyards, had walls about 7.5 metres (25 ft) long. An open space on the eastern side contained a brick oven. A threshold which allowed crossing between the two courtyards remains well preserved.

Beginning in the latter half of the 1st century AD, this house displayed markedly different characteristics than the other excavated houses. The rough walls of the main room were reworked with care and plastered. Furthermore, almost no domestic ceramics are recovered, but lamps and large storage jars abound. This suggests that the house was no longer used as a residence but a communal gathering place. One explanation suggested for this treatment is that the room was venerated as a religious gathering place, a domus ecclesiae or house church, for the Christian community. This suggestion has been critiqued by several scholars, however. In particular, where excavators had claimed to find graffiti including the name of Peter, others have found very little legible writing. Others have questioned whether the space is actually a room; the paved floor, the large space without supports, and the presence of a cooking space have prompted some to note that these are more consistent with yet another courtyard.

=== 4th-century transformation ===
In this period, the sacra insula acquired a new appearance. First, a thick-walled, slightly trapezoidal enclosure was built surrounding the entire insula; its sides were 27–30 metres (89–98 ft) long. Made of plaster, they reached a height of 2.3 metres (7.5 ft) on the north side. It had two doors, one in the southwest corner and the other in the northeast corner. Next, although there is evidence that the private houses of the compound/insula remained in use after the transformation, the one particular room that had before been treated differently was profoundly altered and expanded. A central archway was added to support a roof, and the north wall was strengthened with mortar. Pavement was installed, and the walls and floor were plastered. The 4th-century structure remained standing until the middle of the 5th century, when the sacra insula was dismantled and replaced with a larger basilica.

=== Octagonal 5th-century church ===
The 5th-century church consists of a central octagon with eight pillars, an exterior octagon with thresholds still in situ, and a gallery or portico that leads both into the interior of the church as well as into a complex of associated buildings to the east, a linkage achieved via a short passageway. Later this passage was blocked, and an apse with a baptismal pool was constructed in the middle of the east wall. From this wall ascended two stairs on either side of the baptistery, and the excess water from the rite would have escaped along this path. The Byzantines, upon constructing the new church, placed the central octagon directly on top of the walls of Saint Peter's house with the aim of preserving its exact location, although none of the original house was visible any longer, as the walls had been torn down and the floor covered in mosaics.

In the portico, the pattern of the mosaic is geometric, with four rows of contiguous circles and small crosses. In the zone of the external octagon, the mosaics represented plants and animals in a style similar to that found in the Basilica of the Feeding of the Five Thousand in nearby Tabgha. In the central octagon, the mosaic was composed of a strip of calcified flowers, of a field of schools of fish with small flowers, and of a great circle with a peacock in the center. The peacock is possibly alluding to Jesus' healing miracles believed to have taken place at the site.

=== Memorial (1990) ===
The "memorial" is a modern church built above the excavated remains of the ancient house and the Byzantine octagonal church, dedicated in 1990. The disk-shaped structure stands on eight concrete stilts, ensuring visibility to the venerated ancient building, both directly, at ground level (which allows for a sideways view), and through a glass floor located at the centre of the stilt-raised church (which allows a direct view of the excavated remains below).

== See also ==
- Ancient synagogues in the Palestine region
- Ancient synagogues in Israel
- Archaeology of Israel
- List of oldest synagogues
- New Testament places associated with Jesus
- Tourism in Israel
- Woes to the unrepentant cities, pronounced by Jesus and which include Capernaum
