= Matthew 4 =

- ← chapter 3 chapter 5 →
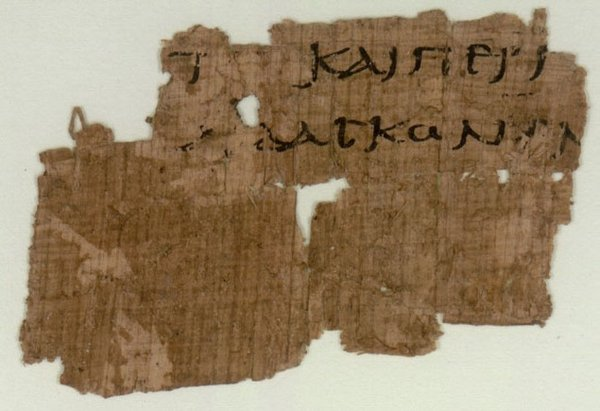
- Matthew 4:22–23 on Papyrus 102 (3rd century)
- Book: Gospel of Matthew
- Category: Gospel
- Christian Bible part: New Testament
- Order in the Christian part: 1

Matthew 4 is the fourth chapter of the Gospel of Matthew in the New Testament of Christian Bible. Many translations of the gospel and biblical commentaries separate the first section of chapter 4 (verses 1–11, Matthew's account of the Temptation of Christ by the devil) from the remaining sections, which deal with Jesus' first public preaching and the gathering of his first disciples.

== Text ==
The original text was written in Koine Greek. This chapter is divided into 25 verses.

=== Textual witnesses ===
Some early manuscripts containing the text of chapter 4 are:

- Papyrus 101 (~250; extant verses 1–3)
- Papyrus 102 (3rd century; extant verses 11–12, 22–23)
- Codex Vaticanus (325–350)
- Codex Sinaiticus (330–360)
- Codex Bezae (~400)
- Codex Washingtonianus (~400)
- Codex Ephraemi Rescriptus (~450)

== Structure ==
The New King James Version organises chapter 4 as follows:

- Matthew 4:1–11 – Satan tempts Jesus
- Matthew 4:12–17 – Jesus begins his Galilean ministry
- Matthew 4:18–22 – Four fishermen called as disciples
- Matthew 4:23–25 – Jesus heals a great multitude

The New Revised Standard Version divides the chapter into three sections: Matthew 4:1–11, 4:12–22, and 4:23–25.

John Calvin's Commentary treats verses 1–4, 5–11, 13–16 and 18–25 as separate sections.

== Temptation of Christ ==
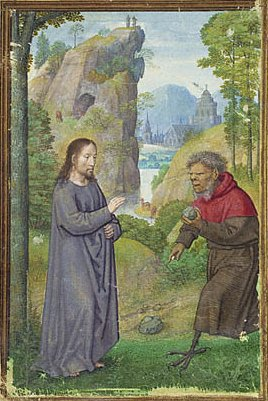
16th century master illuminator Simon Bening's illustration of the temptation of Christ. The foreground shows the first temptation with the devil offering a stone to be turned into bread. In the background the other two temptation scenes are depicted.

In the first 11 verses of chapter 4, Jesus is led into the wilderness and fasts for 40 days. Satan ("the tempter", or "the devil") tempts Jesus three times: in verse 3 with food to relieve Jesus' fast, in verse 6 with testing God, and in verse 9 with control of all the kingdoms of the earth.

=== Commentary ===
There are a number of theories regarding the temptations. One suggests that the three temptations show Jesus rejecting various visions of the Messiah. In the first temptation he shows that he will not be an "economic" messiah, who will use his powers to feed the world's hungry. In the second that he will not be a miracle worker who puts on great spectacles, and the third that he will not be a political saviour but rather a spiritual one. There are several references to the period after the Exodus from Egypt; it is this section of the Hebrew Bible that Jesus draws his quotes from. In that section, the Israelites anger God by testing him and they soon compromise their principles for political power, mistakes that Jesus does not make.

In the Gospel of Mark, chapter 1, the temptation narrative takes only two verses. The Gospel of Luke's account is quite similar to Matthew's, with only somewhat different wording and with the order of the second and third temptations reversed. It is thus widely believed that much of this section in Matthew came from the hypothetical document Q. Eduard Schweizer notes that Q likely contained little except the actual dialogue, as the extra information is quite different in the two gospels. Commentary writer David Hill argues that Mark is written in a manner which assumes the author's audience is already familiar with the temptation narrative, so this dialogue may have been widely known by the early Christians and thus not necessarily in Q.

Scholars generally consider Matthew's account to be more likely to be the original arrangement; however, Luke's version became more popular in the tradition.

=== Literary significance ===
The temptation scene related here has inspired a number of works of literature. It is briefly recounted in Paradise Lost and is retold in great detail and expanded upon in Paradise Regained. It also is an important inspiration for The Brothers Karamazov and Murder in the Cathedral. The book The Last Temptation of Christ and its 1989 film adaptation also expand upon Christ being tempted by Satan.

== Commencement of Jesus' ministry ==
The remaining verses of chapter 4 (verses 12 to 25) are generally seen as the introduction to the ministry of Jesus, which will take up the next several chapters of the Gospel and in the Sermon on the Mount, which begins immediately after this chapter. Jesus begins to preach a gospel of repentance: his words are the same as those of John the Baptist, now imprisoned in Machaerus Palace:

Repent, for the kingdom of heaven is at hand.

Verses 18 to 22 describe the calling of the first four fishermen, who become his first disciples: two, Simon Peter and Andrew, were casting a net into the sea, and two, James, and John, working with Zebedee their father, were repairing their nets. The disciples abandon their possessions and family to become what Jesus calls "fishers of men".

The final three verses introduce the crowds whom Jesus addresses. These verses also serve as a summary of Jesus' ministry, outlining the three forms it takes: teaching, preaching, and healing.

== Verses ==
- Matthew 4:1
- Matthew 4:2
- Matthew 4:3
- Matthew 4:4
- Matthew 4:5
- Matthew 4:6
- Matthew 4:7
- Matthew 4:8
- Matthew 4:9
- Matthew 4:10
- Matthew 4:11
- Matthew 4:12
- Matthew 4:13
- Matthew 4:14
- Matthew 4:15
- Matthew 4:16
- Matthew 4:17
- Matthew 4:18
- Matthew 4:19
- Matthew 4:20
- Matthew 4:21
- Matthew 4:22
- Matthew 4:23
- Matthew 4:24
- Matthew 4:25

== Old Testament references ==
Matthew 4:6 references Psalm 91:11–12.

== See also ==
- Jewish messianism
- Messianic prophecies of Jesus
- Mount of Temptation
- Related Bible parts: Isaiah 9, Mark 1, Luke 4

== Sources ==
- Albright, W.F. and C.S. Mann. "Matthew". The Anchor Bible Series. New York: Doubleday & Company, 1971.
- Clarke, Howard W. The Gospel of Matthew and its Readers: A Historical Introduction to the First Gospel. Bloomington: Indiana University Press, 2003.
- France, R.T. The Gospel According to Matthew: an Introduction and Commentary. Leicester: Inter-Varsity, 1985.
- Gundry, Robert H. Matthew a Commentary on his Literary and Theological Art. Grand Rapids: William B. Eerdmans Publishing Company, 1982.
- Hill, David (1981). The Gospel of Matthew. Grand Rapids: Eerdmans.
- Jones, Alexander. The Gospel According to St. Matthew. London: Geoffrey Chapman, 1965.
- Schweizer, Eduard (1975). The Good News According to Matthew. Atlanta: John Knox Press.
