= Matthew 4:5 =

- ← 4:4 4:6 →
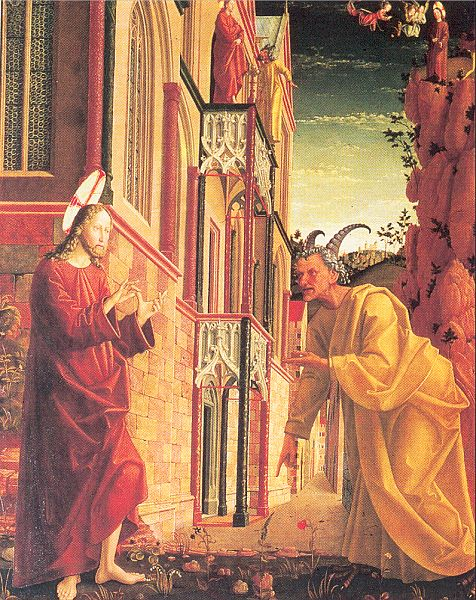
- Temptation of Christ by Michael Pacher (1435-1598)
- Book: Gospel of Matthew
- Christian Bible part: New Testament

Matthew 4:5 is the fifth verse of the fourth chapter of the Gospel of Matthew in the New Testament. Jesus has just rebuffed Satan's first temptation, and in this verse the devil transports him to the site of the second temptation.

== Content ==
In the King James Version of the Bible the text reads:

Then the devil taketh him up
into the holy city, and setteth
him on a pinnacle of the temple,

The World English Bible translates the passage as:

Then the devil took him into
the holy city. He set him on
the pinnacle of the temple,

The 1881 Westcott-Hort Greek text is:

τοτε παραλαμβανει αυτον ο διαβολος εις την αγιαν πολιν
και εστησεν αυτον επι το πτερυγιον του ιερου

For a collection of other versions see BibleHub Matthew 4:5

== Analysis ==
The "holy city" is unquestionably a reference to Jerusalem, as the mention of The Temple makes clear. In Luke's version of this scene at Luke 4:9, the city is named as such. Both names are used in the retelling of this event in Revelation 21:10.

Nolland notes that the word translated as taketh/took here and in Matthew 4:8 is the same verb as was used to refer to Joseph taking Jesus to Egypt and back in Matthew 2:14 and Matthew 2:21. Nolland feels that this establishes a subtle contrast between Joseph's righteous transportation of Jesus and Satan's evil designs.

What is meant by the word traditionally translated as "pinnacle" is not entirely clear. Schweizer notes that in Greek the term is very similar to "little wings": he feels that "little tower" or "parapet" would be a more accurate translation. France notes that the word occurs nowhere in classical literature to refer to an architectural feature, though it is used in reference to a projection from a piece of armour or machinery. Harrington believes that the verse may be linked to the reference to protecting wings in Psalm 91:4. Gundry lists three sites on the temple that have been considered for the setting of this scene. Artists and others using the traditional translation "pinnacle" generally set the event on the top of the temple's main tower above the sanctuary proper, some 180 feet above ground. Another view is that it was set atop the lintel of the main gateway into the temple, the most prominent position where the pair could easily have been seen. The third site, and that adopted by tradition, is that it was at a tower the southeast corner of the outer wall that looks down into the Kidron Valley. In a related tradition, James the Just was said to have been executed by being thrown from this same tower.

== Commentary from the Church Fathers ==
Pseudo-Chrysostom: "From this first answer of Christ, the Devil could learn nothing certain whether He were God or man; he therefore betook him to another temptation, saying within himself; This man who is not sensible of the appetite of hunger, if not the Son of God, is yet a holy man; and such do attain strength not to be overcome by hunger; but when they have subdued every necessity of the flesh, they often fall by desire of empty glory. Therefore he began to tempt Him by this empty glory."

Jerome: "Took him, not because the Lord was weak, but the enemy proud; he imputed to a necessity what the Saviour did willingly."

Rabanus Maurus: "Jerusalem was called the Holy City, for in it was the Temple of God, the Holy of holies, and the worship of the one God according to the law of Moses."

Saint Remigius: "This shows that the Devil lies in wait for Christ’s faithful people even in the sacred places."

Gregory the Great: "Behold when it is said that this God was taken by the Devil into the holy city, pious ears tremble to hear, and yet the Devil is head and chief among the wicked; what wonder that He suffered Himself to be led up a mountain by the wicked one himself, who suffered Himself to be crucified by his members."

Glossa Ordinaria: "The Devil places us on high places by exalting with pride, that he may dash us to the ground again."

Saint Remigius: "The pinnacle is the seat of the doctors; for the temple had not a pointed roof like our houses, but was flat on the top after the manner of the country of Palestine, and in the temple were three stories. It should be known, that the pinnacle was on the floor, and in each story was one pinnacle. Whether then he placed Him on the pinnacle in the first story, or that in the second, or the third, he placed Him whence a fall was possible."

Glossa Ordinaria: (ord.) "Observe here that all these things were done with bodily sense, and by careful comparison of the context it seems probable that the Devil appeared in human form."

Pseudo-Chrysostom: "Perhaps you may say, How could he in the sight of all place Him bodily upon the temple? Perhaps the Devil so took Him as though He were visible to all, while He, without the Devil being aware of it, made Himself invisible."

Glossa Ordinaria: (ap. Anselm.) "He set Him on a pinnacle of the temple when he would tempt Him through ambition, because in this seat of the doctors he had before taken many through the same temptation, and therefore thought that when set in the same seat, He might in like manner be puffed up with vain pride."

| Preceded by Matthew 4:4 | Gospel of Matthew; Chapter 4 | Succeeded by Matthew 4:6 |
