= Matthew 4:7 =

- ← 4:6 4:8 →
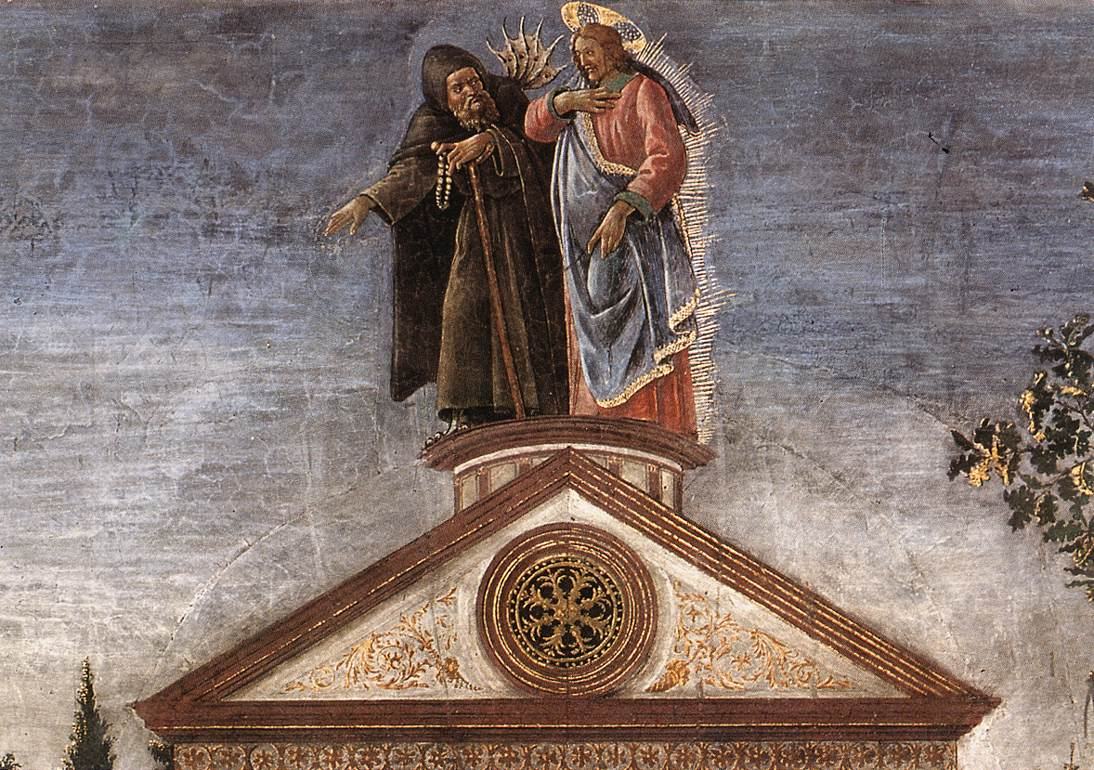
- Part of Sandro Botticelli's The Temptation of Christ
- Book: Gospel of Matthew
- Christian Bible part: New Testament

Matthew 4:7 is the seventh verse of the fourth chapter of the Gospel of Matthew in the New Testament. Satan has transported Jesus to the pinnacle of the Temple of Jerusalem and told Jesus that he should throw himself down, as God in Psalm 91 promised that no harm would befall him. In this verse, Jesus quotes scripture to rebuff the devil.

== Content ==
The original Koine Greek, according to Novum Testamentum Graece, reads:

ἔφη αὐτῷ ὁ Ἰησοῦς πάλιν γέγραπται
οὐκ ἐκπειράσεις κύριον τὸν θεόν σου.

In the King James Version of the Bible the text reads:

Jesus said unto him, It is written again,
Thou shalt not tempt the Lord thy God.

The World English Bible translates the passage as:

Jesus said to him, "Again, it is written,
‘You shall not test the Lord, your God.’"

For a collection of other versions see BibleHub Matthew 4:7.

== Analysis ==
As in his response to the first temptation in Matthew 4:4 Jesus again responds by quoting scripture. This quotation comes from Deuteronomy 6:16 a verse that comes two chapters before that quoted in 4:4. As with the earlier quotation it uses the exact translation found in the Septuagint. In this section of Deuteronomy Moses is instructing the Israelites on proper behaviour. In full Deuteronomy 6:16 reads "Do not test the Lord your God as you did at Massah." This is a reference to the events of Exodus 17:5 where the Israelites wandering in the desert doubted God was with them (cf. Psalm 95:9; Numbers 14:22ff). This passage is thus seen as the clearest evidence that the temptation narrative shows how Jesus avoided making the same errors as the Israelites. The quoting of Moses' dictate is also seen as a rejection of Antinomianism. Satan had originally quoted from Psalms, but Fortna notes that Jesus replies with a more fundamental verse by quoting from the Torah.

Thomas Long notes that after the child Jesus had followed the journey of Israel into Egypt, the adult Jesus retraced the adventure of Israel in the wilderness. The temptations that Jesus faced echoes the very temptations, even in the same order, that the Israelites experienced after the exodus from slavery in Egypt (Exodus 16, 17 and 19–32).

In the Gospel of Luke this temptation is the final one, and that is the ordering most commonly used by Christians. By tradition after Jesus rebuffs Satan it is Satan who plummets from the top of the temple, something frequently depicted in art and recounted in some detail in Paradise Regained.

== Commentary from the Church Fathers ==
Hilary of Poitiers: "Thus beating down the efforts of the Devil, He professes Himself both God and Lord."

Pseudo-Chrysostom: "Yet He says not, Thou shalt not tempt me thy Lord God; but, Thou shalt not tempt the Lord thy God; which every man of God when tempted by the Devil might say; for whoso tempts a man of God, tempts God."

Rabanus Maurus: "Otherwise, it was a suggestion to Him, as man, that He should seek by requiring some miracle to know the greatness of God’s power."

Augustine: "It is a part of sound doctrine, that when man has any other means, he should not tempt the Lord his God."

Theodotus: "And it is to tempt God, in anything to expose one’s self to danger without cause."

Jerome: "the required texts are taken from the book of Deuteronomy only, that He might shew the sacraments of the second Law."

== Sources ==
- Bruce, F.F. (2014). Matthew. Vol. 1. BookBaby. ISBN 9781909680296.
- Long, Thomas G. (1997). Matthew. Westminster Bible companion. Westminster John Knox Press. ISBN 9780664252571.

Preceded by Matthew 4:6	Gospel of Matthew; Chapter 4	Succeeded by Matthew 4:8
