= Matthew 4:21 =

- ← 4:20 4:22 →
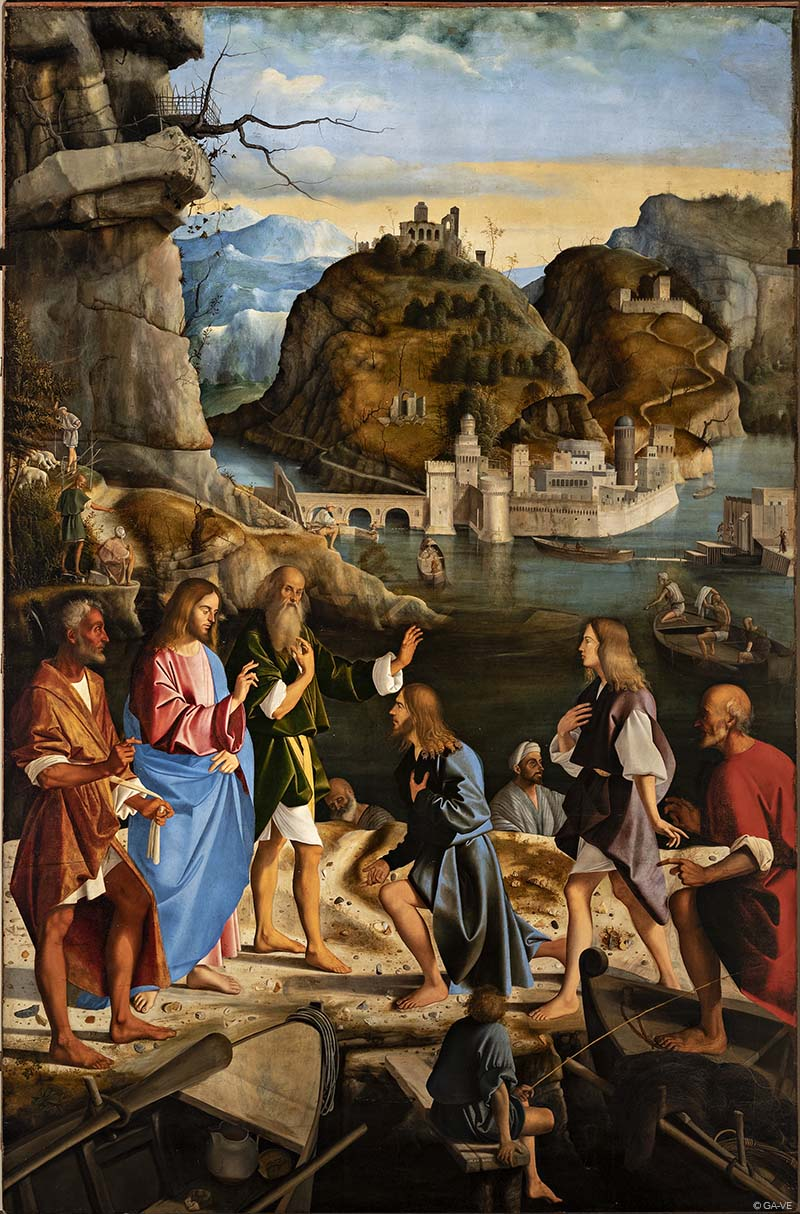
- Call of the Sons of Zebedee by Marco Basaiti, 1510
- Book: Gospel of Matthew
- Christian Bible part: New Testament

Matthew 4:21 is the twenty-first verse of the fourth chapter of the Gospel of Matthew in the New Testament. Jesus has just recruited Simon Peter and Andrew as disciples. In this verse he encounters the brothers James and John.

== Content ==
The original Koine Greek, according to Westcott and Hort, reads:

και προβας εκειθεν ειδεν αλλους δυο αδελφους ιακωβον τον του ζεβεδαιου και ιωαννην τον αδελφον αυτου
εν τω πλοιω μετα ζεβεδαιου του πατρος αυτων καταρτιζοντας τα δικτυα αυτων και εκαλεσεν αυτους

In the King James Version of the Bible the text reads:

And going on from thence, he saw other two brethren, James the son of Zebedee, and John
his brother, in a ship with Zebedee their father, mending their nets; and he called them.

The World English Bible translates the passage as:

Going on from there, he saw two other brothers, James the son of Zebedee, and
John his brother, in the boat with Zebedee their father, mending their nets. He called them.

For a collection of other versions see Biblehub Matthew 4:21.

== Analysis ==
This verse introduces two more of Jesus' disciples, James and John. They are the last disciples introduced in the Gospel other than Matthew himself in Matthew 9:9. This verse is very similar to Mark 1:21, with the major difference being that Matthew makes clear that Zebedee was in the ship with his sons. Like Simon and Andrew, James and John are fishers: see Matthew 4:18 for a discussion of fishing on the Sea of Galilee. Luke's very different description of the calling of the disciples notes that James and John were partners with Simon and Andrew, but the Gospel of Matthew does not mention any link between the two pairs.

Repairing nets was an important part of fishing at the time. McNamer notes that the general practice was to spread the nets on shore to mend them, repairing the nets on ship was something only done in an emergency. Albright and Mann see much importance in the use of the word mending, a term that appears eight times in the New Testament. They feel that the act of restoring and making perfect may symbolically represent the mission of the disciples. Nolland notes that mending might not be the full meaning of the word, and that it could instead refer simply to gathering the nets and preparing them for use.

== Commentary from the Church Fathers ==
Glossa Ordinaria: (ap. Anselm.) These last disciples were an example to such as leave their property for the love of Christ; now follows an example of others who postponed earthly affection to God. Observe how He calls them two and two, as He afterwards sent them two and two to preach.

Gregory the Great: (Hom. in Ex. 17:1.) Hereby we are also silently admonished, that he who wants affection towards others, ought not to take on him the office of preaching. The precepts of charity are two, and between less than two there can be no love.

Pseudo-Chrysostom: Rightly did He thus build the foundations of the brotherhood of the Church on love, that from such roots a copious sap of love might flow to the branches; and that too on natural or human love, that nature as well as grace might bind their love more firmly. They were moreover brothers; and so did God in the Old Testament lay the foundations of His building on Moses and Aaron, brothers. But as the grace of the New Testament is more abundant than that of the Old, therefore the first people were built upon one pair of brethren, but the new people upon two. They were washing their nets, a proof of the extremest indigence; they repaired the old because they had not whence they should buy new. And what shews their great filial piety, in this their great poverty they deserted not their father, but carried him with them in their vessel, not that he might aid in their labour, but have the enjoyment of his sons’ presence.

Chrysostom: It is no small sign of goodness, to bear poverty easily, to live by honest labour, to be bound together by virtue of affection, to keep their poor father with them, and to toil in his service.

Pseudo-Chrysostom: We may not dare to consider the former disciples as more quick to preach, because they were casting their nets; and these latter as less active, because they were yet making ready only; for it is Christ alone that may know their differences. But perhaps we may say that the first were casting their nets, because Peter preached the Gospel, but committed it not to paper—the others were making ready their nets, because John composed a Gospel. He called them together, for by their abode they were fellow-townsmen, in affection attached, in profession agreed, and united by brotherly tenderness. He called them then at once, that united by so many common blessings they might not be separated by a separate call.

Chrysostom: He made no promise to them when He called them, as He had to the former, for the obedience of the first had made the way plain for them. Besides, they had heard many things concerning Him, as being friends and townsmen of the others.

Pseudo-Chrysostom: There are three things which we must leave who would come to Christ; carnal actions, which are signified in the fishing nets; worldly substance, in the ship; parents, which are signified in their father. They left their own vessel, that they might become governors of the vessel of the Church; they left their nets, as having no longer to draw out fishes on to the earthly shore, but men to the heavenly; they left their father, that they might become the spiritual fathers of all.

Preceded by Matthew 4:20	Gospel of Matthew; Chapter 4	Succeeded by Matthew 4:22
