= Matthew 4:10 =

- ← 4:9 4:11 →
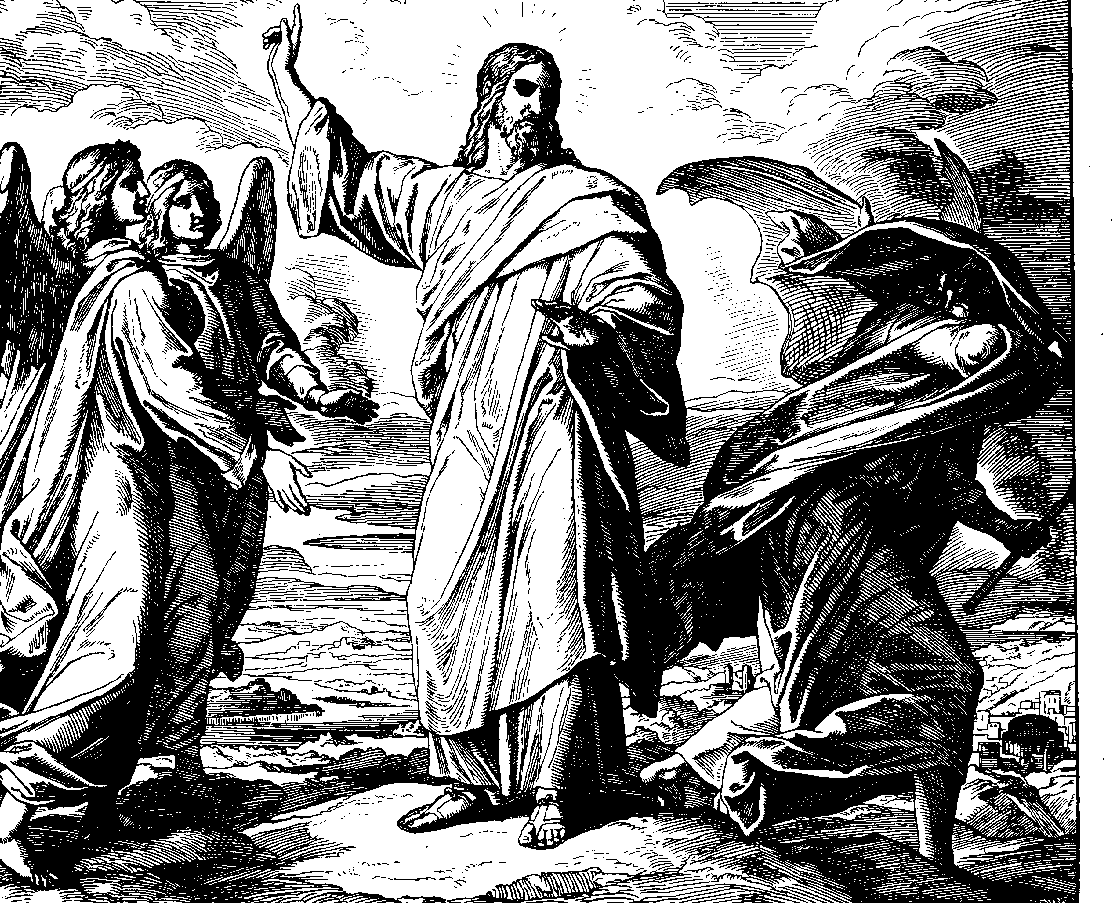
- A 19th century woodcut by Julius Schnorr von Carolsfeld depicting the scene
- Book: Gospel of Matthew
- Christian Bible part: New Testament

Matthew 4:10 is the tenth verse of the fourth chapter of the Gospel of Matthew in the New Testament. Jesus has rebuffed two earlier temptations by Satan. The devil has thus transported Jesus to the top of a great mountain and offered him control of the world to Jesus if he agrees to worship him. In this verse, Jesus rejects this temptation.

== Content ==
In the Catholic Bible, the text states:

At this, Jesus said to him, “Get away, Satan! It is written:
‘The Lord, your God, shall you worship,
and him alone shall you serve.’”

In the King James Version of the Bible, the text reads:

Then saith Jesus unto him, Get thee hence,
Satan: for it is written, Thou shalt worship the
Lord thy God, and him only shalt thou serve.

The English Standard Version translates the passage as:

Then Jesus said to him, “Be gone, Satan!
For it is written, ‘You shall worship the Lord your God
and him only shall you serve.’”

The Novum Testamentum Graece text is:

τότε λέγει αὐτῷ ὁ Ἰησοῦς Ὕπαγε, Σατανᾶ·
γέγραπται γάρ Κύριον τὸν θεόν σου προσκυνήσεις
καὶ αὐτῷ μόνῳ λατρεύσεις.

For a collection of other versions see BibleHub Matthew 4:10

== Analysis ==
In contrast with Matthew 4:1 where "the devil" is named, here Jesus refers to the devil as Satan (cf. Matthew 12:26; 16:23), which is the same as Beelzebul (Matthew 10:25; 12:24, 27). Throughout Matthew, the devil and his evil underlings are always overpowered (cf. Matthew 4:23; 8:16, 28; 9:32; 12:22; 15:22; 17:18; 23:39). Jesus again quotes scripture in response to the temptation, this time the quote is from the passage on the Israelites rejection of idolatry in Deuteronomy 6:13. The Spirit-led behavior that Jesus demonstrates here is significant: to know God's command and its context means to obey, with no added reasoning to God's simple commands (cf. Psalm 119:11). The verse uses the word "worship" (not the word "fear" as in the Septuagint), to better tie in with the temptation, and adds only at the end for added emphasis.

== Commentary from the Church Fathers ==
Pseudo-Chrysostom: With these words, He puts an end to the temptations of the Devil, that they should proceed no further.

Jerome: The Devil and Peter are not, as many suppose, condemned to the same sentence. To Peter it is said, Get thee behind me, Satan; i. e. follow thou behind Me who art contrary to My will. But here it is, Go, Satan, and is not added ‘behind Me,’ that we may understand into the fire prepared for thee and thy angels.

Saint Remigius: Other copies read, Get thee behind me; i. e. remember thee in what glory thou wast created, and into what misery thou hast fell.

Pseudo-Chrysostom: Observe how Christ when Himself suffered wrong at the hands of the Devil, being tempted of him, saying, If thou be the Son of God, cast thyself down, yet was not moved to chide the Devil. But now when the Devil usurps the honor of God, he is wroth, and drives him away, saying, Go thy way, Satan; that we may learn by His example to bear injuries to ourselves with magnanimity, but wrongs to God, to endure not so much as to hear; for to be patient under our wrongs is praiseworthy, to dissemble when God is wronged is impiety.

Jerome: When the Devil says to the Saviour, If thou wilt fall and worship me, he is answered by the contrary declaration, that it more becomes him to worship Jesus as his Lord and God.

Augustine: (cont. Serm. Arian. 29.) The one Lord our God is the Holy Trinity, to which alone we justly owe the service of piety.

Augustine: (De Civ. Dei, x. 1.) By service is to be understood the honor due to God; as our version renders the Greek word ‘latria,’ wherever it occurs in Scripture, by ‘service’ (servitus), but that service which is due to men (as where the Apostle bids slaves are subject to their masters) is in Greek called ‘dulia;’ while ‘latria,’ always, or so often that we say always, is used of that worship which belongs to God.

== Sources ==
- Allison, Dale C. Jr. (2007). "57. Matthew". In Barton, John; Muddiman, John (eds.). The Oxford Bible Commentary (first (paperback) ed.). Oxford University Press. ISBN 978-0199277186.
- Coogan, Michael David (2007). Coogan, Michael David; Brettler, Marc Zvi; Newsom, Carol Ann; Perkins, Pheme (eds.). The New Oxford Annotated Bible with the Apocryphal/Deuterocanonical Books: New Revised Standard Version, Issue 48 (Augmented 3rd ed.). Oxford University Press. ISBN 9780195288810.
- France, R.T. (2007). Bruce, Frederick Fyvie (ed.). The Gospel of Matthew. New international commentary on the New Testament. Wm. B. Eerdmans Publishing. ISBN 9780802825018.
- Keener, Craig S. (1999). A commentary on the Gospel of Matthew. Wm. B. Eerdmans Publishing. ISBN 978-0-8028-3821-6.
- Phillips, John (2005). Exploring the Gospel of Matthew: An Expository Commentary. The John Phillips Commentary Series. Vol. 1 (reprint ed.). Kregel Academic. ISBN 9780825433924.

Preceded by Matthew 4:9	Gospel of Matthew; Chapter 4	Succeeded by Matthew 4:11
