= Matthew 4:22 =

- ← 4:21 4:23 →
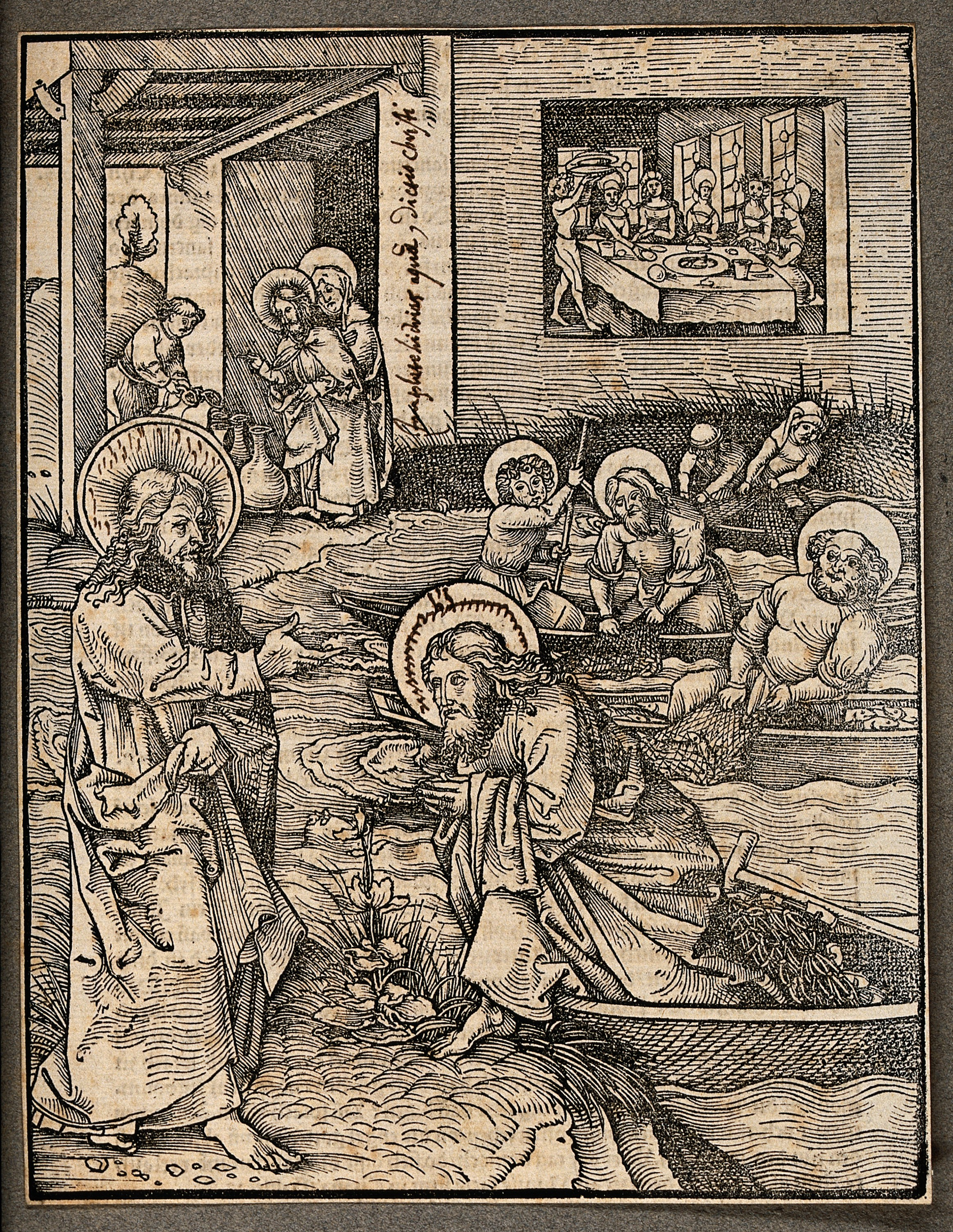
- Jesus calls the fishermen to be his apostles; in the background he performs the miracle at Cana. Woodcut. Iconographic Collections. Wellcome Trust
- Book: Gospel of Matthew
- Christian Bible part: New Testament

Matthew 4:22 is the twenty-second verse of the fourth chapter of the Gospel of Matthew in the New Testament. After recruiting Simon Peter and Andrew as disciples, Jesus encountered the brothers James and John and their father Zebedee. In this verse they also join him.

== Content ==
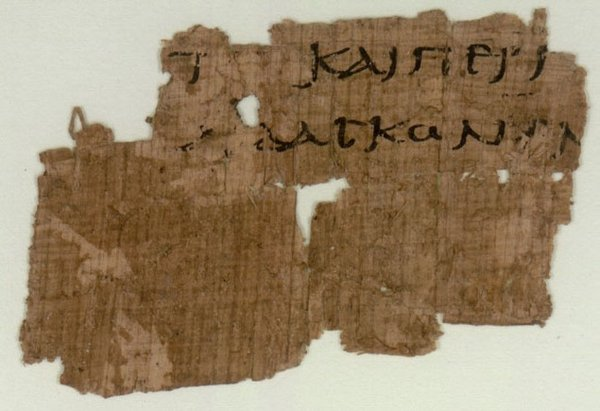
Matthew 4:22-23 on Papyrus 102 (3rd century).

The text in Koine Greek, according to Westcott and Hort, reads:

οι δε ευθεως αφεντες το πλοιον και
τον πατερα αυτων ηκολουθησαν αυτω

In the King James Version of the Bible the text reads:

And they immediately left the ship
and their father, and followed him.

The World English Bible translates the passage as:

They immediately left the boat and
their father, and followed him.

For a collection of other versions see BibleHub Matthew 4:22

== Analysis ==
This verse is quite similar to Matthew 4:20 where Simon Peter and Andrew choose to follow Jesus. Like that verse the immediacy and renunciative nature of their becoming disciples is emphasized. The sacrifice is enhanced in this verse, however, as James and John are not only giving up worldly goods but also abandoning their father. This renunciation of family ties is also emphasized in Matthew 8:21-22. Carter feels this is evidence that Jesus is rejecting the traditional patriarchal structure of society where the father had command over his children. Instead all will be equally brothers under God the father. Carter notes that the breaking of family ties were not absolute, however. Throughout the Gospel John and James are described as the "sons of Zebedee" and in Matthew 8:14, when the disciples visit Peter's family.

This verse is quite similar to Mark 1:20, except that in that verse the adverb immediately is used to modify Jesus' calling of the pair, not their coming. If the author of Matthew is basing his work on Mark, as is theorized by the two-source hypothesis, then he made a conscious decision to emphasize the rapidity of the disciples response. Immediate obedience to the word of God is an important virtue in the Gospel of Matthew, as seen earlier in Joseph's prompt obedience to the divine messages in Matthew 2.

== Textual witnesses ==
Some early manuscripts containing the text of this verse in Greek are:

- Papyrus 102 (3rd century)
- Codex Vaticanus (325-350)
- Codex Sinaiticus (330-360)
- Codex Bezae (~400)
- Codex Washingtonianus (~400)
- Codex Ephraemi Rescriptus (~450)

== Commentary from the Church Fathers ==
Hilary of Poitiers: By this that they left their occupation and their father's house we are taught, that when we would follow Christ we should not be holden of the cares of secular life, or of the society of the paternal mansion.

== Bibliography ==
- Albright, W.F. and C.S. Mann. "Matthew." The Anchor Bible Series. New York: Doubleday & Company, 1971.
- Schweizer, Eduard. The Good News According to Matthew. Atlanta: John Knox Press, 1975

| Preceded by Matthew 4:21 | Gospel of Matthew; Chapter 4 | Succeeded by Matthew 4:23 |
