= Matthew 4:17 =

- ← 4:16 4:18 →
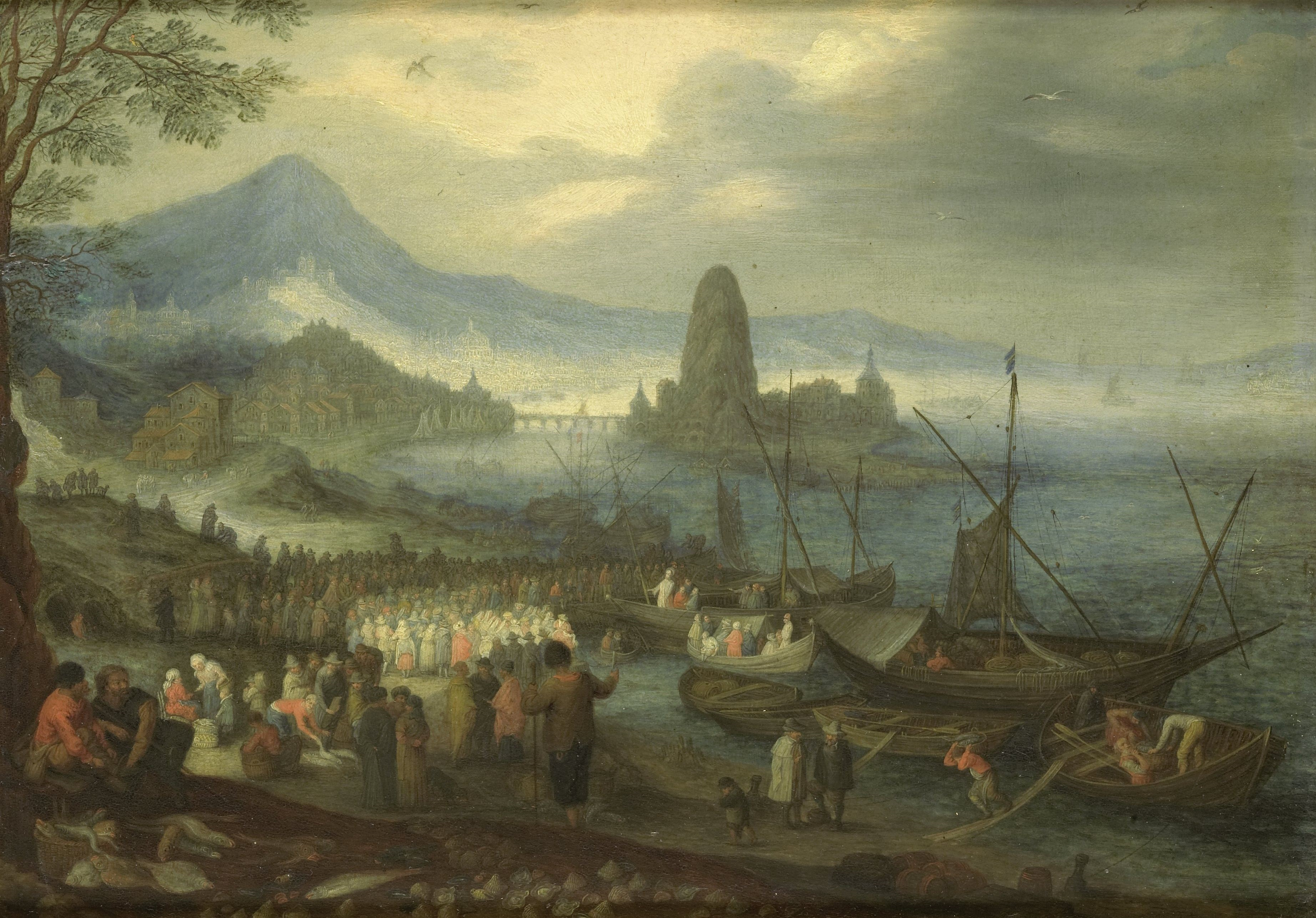
- "Christ Preaching at the Sea of Galilee". Painting by Jan Brueghel the Elder (1568–1625)
- Book: Gospel of Matthew
- Christian Bible part: New Testament

Matthew 4:17 is the seventeenth verse of the fourth chapter of the Gospel of Matthew in the New Testament of the Christian Bible. In the previous verses Jesus returned to Galilee after hearing of the arrest of John the Baptist and then left Nazareth for Capernaum. This verse reports that once in Capernaum, Jesus began to preach.

== Content ==
The original Koine Greek, according to Westcott and Hort, reads:

απο τοτε ηρξατο ο ιησους κηρυσσειν και λεγειν
μετανοειτε ηγγικεν γαρ η βασιλεια των ουρανω

In the King James Version of the Bible the text reads:

From that time Jesus began to
preach, and to say, Repent: for
the kingdom of heaven is at hand.

The New International Version translates the passage as:

From that time on Jesus began
to preach, "Repent, for the
kingdom of heaven is near."

For a collection of other versions see BibleHub Matthew 4:17.

== Analysis ==
This verse is often seen as the beginning of the main section of Matthew's gospel: Jesus' ministry. The author of Matthew uses the phrase "from that time" three times: here, Matthew 16:21, and Matthew 26:16. Each of the verses is often seen as a turning point in the narrative.

Jesus here uses a line identical to that ascribed to John the Baptist in Matthew 3:2, but here Jesus's call to repentance is calling men to reassess all personal and social values in the approach of the divine kingdom of his ministry. This reassessment reappears in the beatitudes (Matthew 5:3–12. Therefore, 'the message of the kingdom has not changed, but the messenger has'; the difference is crucial. Thomas Long gives a representation that the message by John the Baptist is like a person pointing to the cloud on the horizon and saying that the rain is near, whereas the message by Jesus is saying that the kingdom begins to happen and through him.

== Commentary from the Church Fathers ==
Pseudo-Chrysostom: Christ's Gospel should be preached by him who can control his appetites, who contemns the goods of this life, and desires not empty honours. From this time began Jesus to preach, that is, after having been tempted, He had overcome hunger in the desert, despised covetousness on the mountain, rejected ambitious desires in the temple. Or from the time that John was delivered up; for had He begun to preach while John was yet preaching, He would have made John be lightly accounted of, and John's preaching would have been thought superfluous by the side of Christ's teaching; as when the sun rises at the same time with the morning star, the star's brightness is hid.

Chrysostom: For another cause also He did not preach till John was in prison, that the multitude might not be split into two parties; or as John did no miracle, all men would have been drawn to Christ by His miracles.

Rabanus Maurus: In this He further teaches that none should despise the words of a person inferior to Him; as also the Apostle, If anything be revealed to him that sits, let the first hold his peace. (1 Cor. 14:30.)

Pseudo-Chrysostom: He did wisely in making now the beginning of His preaching, that He should not trample upon John's teaching, but that He might the rather confirm it and demonstrate him to have been a true witness.

Jerome: Shewing also thereby that He was Son of that same God whose prophet John was; and therefore He says, Repent ye.

Pseudo-Chrysostom: He does not straightway preach righteousness which all knew, but repentance, which all needed. Who then dared to say, ‘I desire to be good, but am not able?’ For repentance corrects the will; and if ye will not repent through fear of evil, at least ye may for the pleasure of good things; hence He says, the kingdom of heaven is at hand; that is, the blessings of the heavenly kingdom. As if He had said, Prepare yourselves by repentance, for the time of eternal reward is at hand.

Saint Remigius: And note, He does not say the kingdom of the Canaanite, or the Jebusite, is at hand; but the kingdom of heaven. The law promised worldly goods, but the Lord heavenly kingdoms.

Chrysostom: Also observe how that in this His first address He says nothing of Himself openly; and that very suitably to the case, for they had yet no right opinion concerning Him. In this commencement moreover He speaks nothing severe, nothing burdensome, as John had concerning the axe laid to the root of the condemned tree, and the like; but he puts first things merciful, preaching the glad tidings of the kingdom of heaven.

Jerome: Mystically interpreted, Christ begins to preach as soon as John was delivered to prison, because when the Law ceased, the Gospel commenced.

== Sources ==
- Bruce, F.F. (2014). Matthew. Vol. 1. BookBaby. ISBN 9781909680296.
- Long, Thomas G. (1997). Matthew. Westminster Bible companion. Westminster John Knox Press. ISBN 9780664252571.

Preceded by Matthew 4:16	Gospel of Matthew; Chapter 4	Succeeded by Matthew 4:18
