= Matthew 4:11 =

- ← 4:10 4:12 →
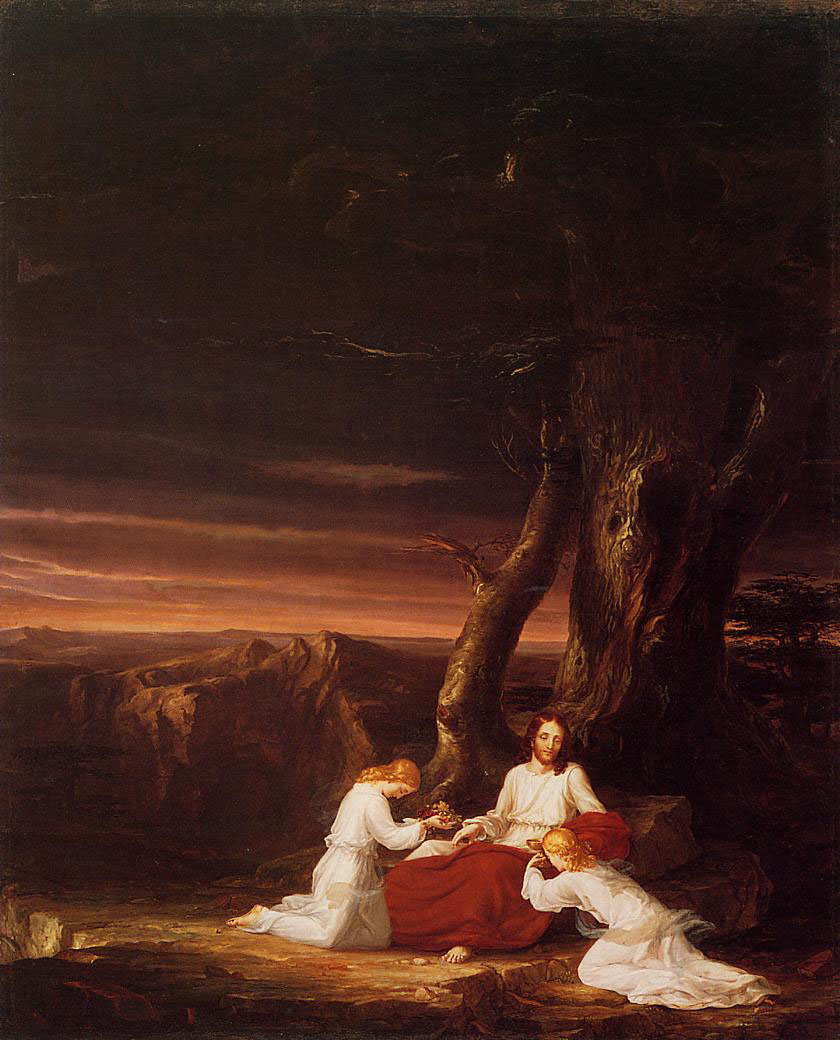
- Thomas Cole's Angels Ministering to Christ in the Wilderness.
- Book: Gospel of Matthew
- Christian Bible part: New Testament

Matthew 4:11 is the eleventh verse of the fourth chapter of the Gospel of Matthew in the New Testament. Jesus has just rebuffed Satan's third temptation and ordered him away. In this last verse of the temptation scene, the devil departs and Jesus is serviced by angels.

== Content ==
The text in Koine Greek, according to the Textus Receptus and Westcott and Hort, reads:

Τότε ἀφίησιν αὐτὸν ὁ διάβολος καὶ ἰδού ἄγγελοι προσῆλθον καὶ διηκόνουν αὐτῷ

In the King James Version of the Bible, the text reads:

Then the devil leaveth him, and, behold,
angels came and ministered unto him.

The English Standard Version translates the passage as:

Then the devil left him, and behold,
angels came and were ministering to him.

For a collection of other versions see BibleHub Matthew 4:11.

== Analysis ==
In the original Greek "devil left him" was in the historic present tense. This indicates that the devil had not left for good and would later return to further tempt Jesus. Luke 4:13 makes this explicit stating that the devil left only to await a more opportune time.

The angels are mentioned in the Gospel of Mark at Mark 1:13 but they are absent from Luke's narrative. As described in Matthew 4:2 Jesus had been fasting for forty days and nights prior to the temptation. The word minister or served is often interpreted as the angels feeding Jesus. France states that this seems to reference 1 Kings 19:5–8 where the prophet Elijah is fed by angels. Traditionally artists have depicted the scene as Jesus being presented with a feast. John Milton in Paradise Regained has a detailed description of the feast the angels present to Jesus. Clarke notes that ending the temptation narrative with a meal reflects the common literary device of using a feast scene to emphasize a happy ending. That the divine angels provide Jesus with the food is a clear sign that it is acceptable for him to break his fast. To Jones the divine relief is proof that Jesus was never wrong because he never lost his faith in God during the temptation scene. Hill notes that in the War Scroll found at Qumran angels are described as forming an army to battle evil. This is somewhat at odds with the portrayal of angels in the gospels, but could in theory be linked to this verse with the angels actually aiding in driving off Satan rather than simply ministering to Jesus.

== Textual witnesses ==
Some early manuscripts containing the text of this verse are:

- Papyrus 102 (3rd century)
- Codex Vaticanus (325-350)
- Codex Sinaiticus (330-360)
- Codex Bezae (~400)
- Codex Washingtonianus (~400)
- Codex Ephraemi Rescriptus (~450)

== Commentary from the Church Fathers ==
Pseudo-Chrysostom: The Devil, we may fairly suppose, did not depart in obedience to the command, but the Divine nature of Christ, and the Holy Spirit which was in Him drove him thence, and then the Devil left him. Which also serves for our consolation, to see that the Devil does not tempt the men of God so long as he wills, but so long as Christ suffers. And though He may suffer him to tempt for a short time, yet in the end, He drives him away because of the weakness of our nature.

Augustine: (De Civ. Dei, ix. 21.) After the temptation the Holy Angels, to be dreaded of all unclean spirits, ministered to the Lord, by which it was made yet more manifest to the dæmons how great was His power.

Pseudo-Chrysostom: He says not ‘Angels descended from heaven,’ that it may be known that they were ever on the earth to minister to Him, but had now by the Lord's command departed from Him, to give opportunity for the Devil to approach, who perhaps when he saw Him surrounded by Angels would not have come near Him. But in what matters they ministered to Him, we cannot know, whether in the healing diseases, or purifying souls, or casting out dæmons; for all these things He does by the ministration of Angels, so that what they do, Himself appears to do. However it is manifest, that they did not now minister to Him because His weakness needed it, but for the honour of His power; for it is not said that they ‘succoured Him,’ but that they ministered to Him.

Gregory the Great: In these things are shown the twofold nature in one person; it is the man whom the Devil tempts; the same is God to whom Angels minister.

Pseudo-Chrysostom: Now let us shortly review what is signified by Christ's temptations. The fasting is abstinence from things evil, hunger is the desire of evil, bread is the gratification of the desire. He who indulges himself in any evil thing, turns stones into bread. Let him answer to the Devil's persuasions that man does not live by the indulgence of desire alone, but by keeping the commands of God. When any is puffed up as though he were holy he is led to the temple, and when he esteems himself to have reached the summit of holiness he is set on a pinnacle of the temple. And this temptation follows the first, because victory over temptation begets conceit. But observe that Christ had voluntarily undertaken the fasting; but was led to the temple by the Devil; therefore do you voluntarily use praiseworthy abstinence, but suffer yourself not to be exalted to the summit of sanctity; fly high-mindedness, and you will not suffer a fall. The ascent of the mountain is the going forward to great riches, and the glory of this world which springs from pride of heart. When you desire to become rich, that is, to ascend the mountain, you begin to think of the ways of gaining wealth and honours, then the prince of this world is shewing you the glory of his kingdom. In the third place He provides you reasons, that if you seek to obtain all these things, you should serve him, and neglect the righteousness of God.

Hilary of Poitiers: When we have overcome the Devil and bruised his head, we see that Angels’ ministry and the offices of heavenly virtues will not be wanting to us.

Augustine: Luke has not given the temptations in the same order as Matthew; so that we do not know whether the pinnacle of the temple, or the ascent of the mountain, was first in the action; but it is of no importance, so long as it is only clear that all of them were truly done.

Glossa Ordinaria: Though Luke's order seems the more historical; Matthew relates the temptations as they were done to Adam.

Preceded by Matthew 4:10	Gospel of Matthew; Chapter 4	Succeeded by Matthew 4:12
