= Papyrus 102 =

- New Testament manuscript
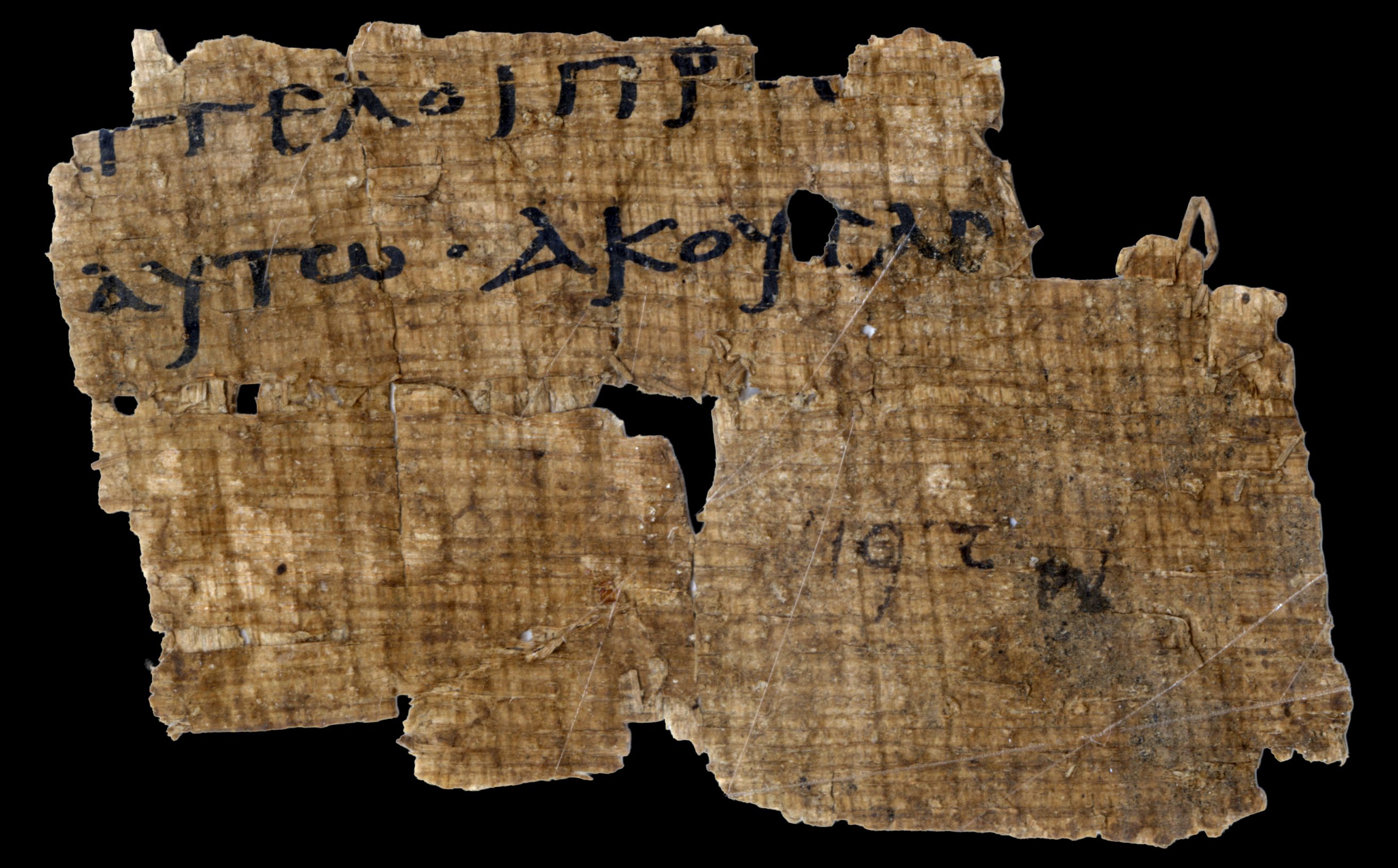
- Recto, Matthew 4:11-12
- Name: P. Oxy. 4402
- Sign: 𝔓^{102}
- Text: Gospel of Matthew 4:11-12; 4:22-23
- Date: 3rd century AD
- Script: Greek
- Found: Oxyrhynchus, Egypt
- Now at: Sackler Library
- Cite: J. David Thomas, OP LXIV (1997), pp. 4-5
- Size: [27] x [14] cm
- Type: Alexandrian text-type

Papyrus 102 (in the Gregory-Aland numbering), designated by 𝔓^{102}, is an early copy of the New Testament in Greek. It is a papyrus manuscript of the Gospel of Matthew. The surviving texts of Matthew are verses 4:11-12; 4:22-23, they are in a fragmentary condition. The manuscript palaeographically has been assigned to the 3rd century.

== Text ==
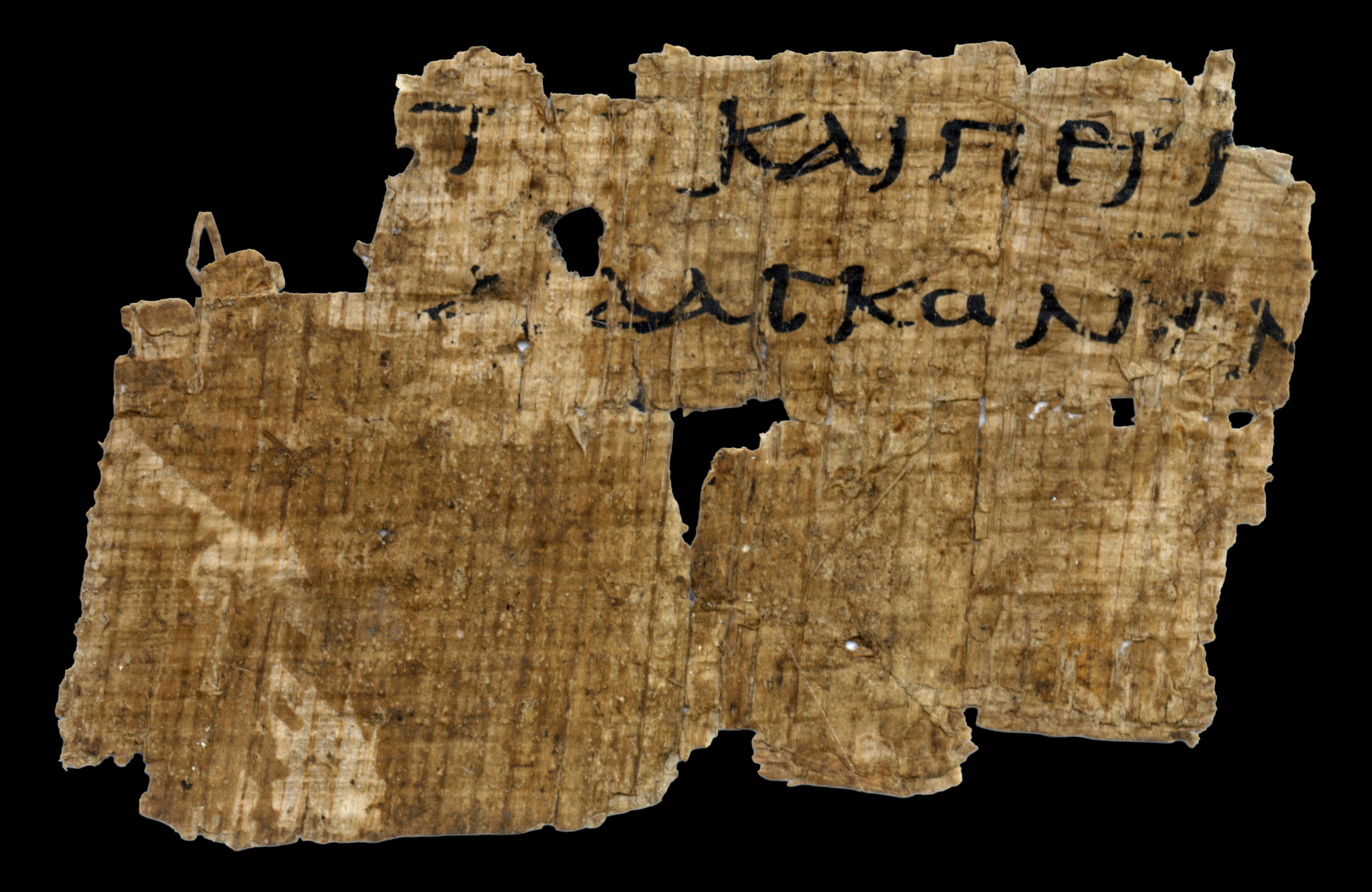
Verso, Matthew 4:22-23

The Greek text of the codex is a representative of the Alexandrian text-type.

== Location ==
The manuscript is currently housed at the Sackler Library (Papyrology Rooms, P. Oxy. 4402) at Oxford.

== See also ==
- List of New Testament papyri
- Matthew 4
- Oxyrhynchus Papyri
