= Matthew 4:9 =

- ← 4:8 4:10 →
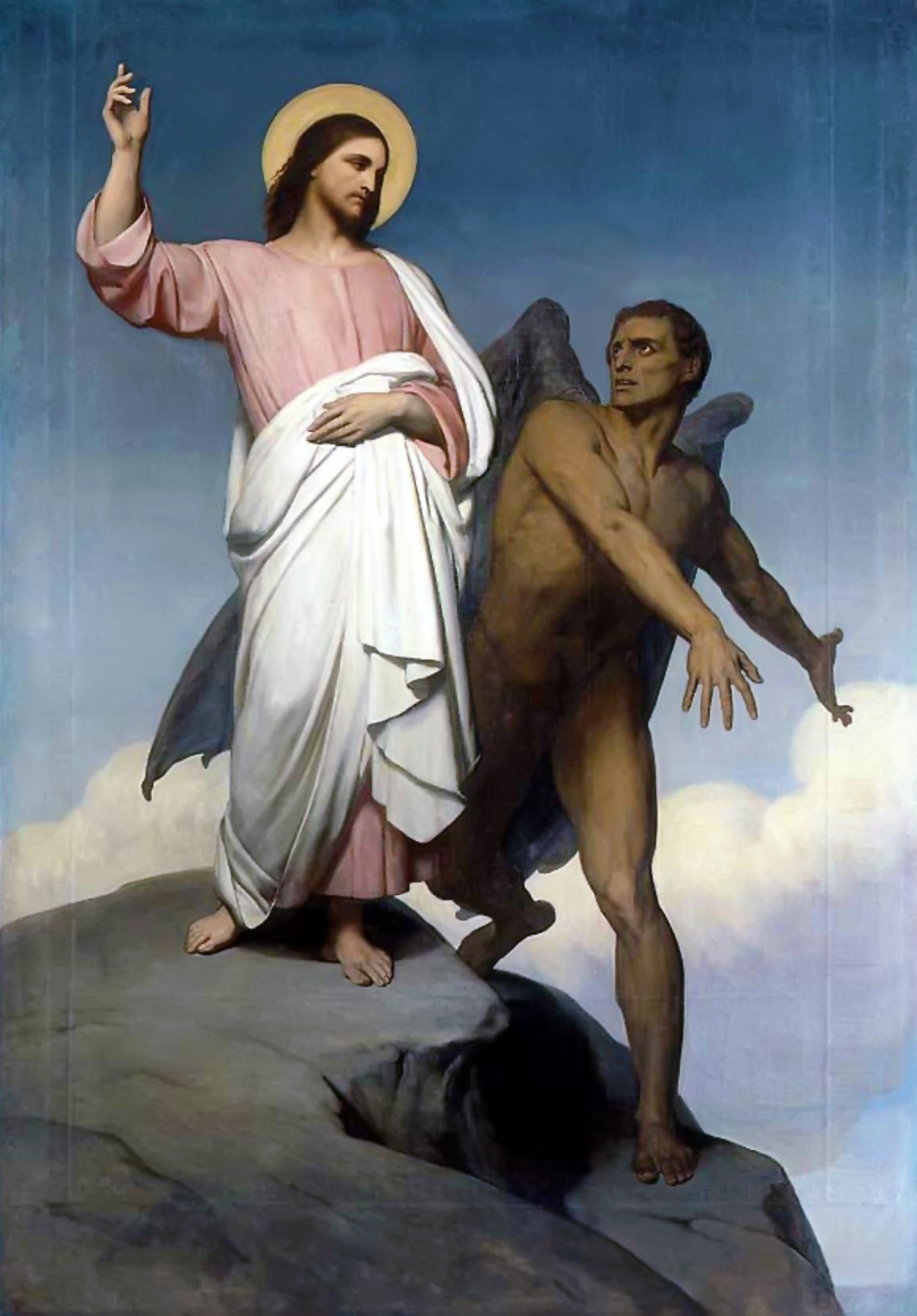
- Ary Scheffer's The Temptation of Christ
- Book: Gospel of Matthew
- Christian Bible part: New Testament

Matthew 4:9 is the ninth verse of the fourth chapter of the Gospel of Matthew in the New Testament. It is part of the Temptation of Christ narrative. Jesus has rebuffed two earlier temptations by Satan. In this verse, Satan offers control of the world to Jesus if he agrees to worship him.

== Content ==
In the King James Version of the Bible the text reads:

And saith unto him, All these things will I
give thee, if thou wilt fall down and worship me.

The World English Bible translates the passage as:

He said to him, "I will give you all of these
things, if you will fall down and worship me."

The Novum Testamentum Graece text is:

καὶ εἶπεν αὐτῷ Ταῦτά σοι πάντα δώσω,
ἐὰν πεσὼν προσκυνήσῃς μοι.

For a collection of other versions see BibleHub Matthew 4:9

== Analysis ==
As hinted in the previous verse and confirmed at Luke 4:6 and John 12:31, this verse seems to show that the devil controlled the world before the coming of Jesus. It also is said to show how unimportant the physical world is; Satan is willing to abandon it to Jesus in exchange for Jesus not threatening him in the spiritual world. Jesus seems to agree that the physical world is secondary and that he is also mainly interested in the spiritual one. This scene has thus been used as an argument for the supremacy of spiritual over secular power. In a famous letter, Pope Gregory VII used this section to assert his precedence over the Holy Roman Emperor.

This temptation is somewhat different from the previous two. In both of those Satan began with "if you are the messiah" and asked Jesus to test his powers. In this verse Jesus' messianic status is confirmed and rather than test his role of Son of God Jesus is asked to confirm it. The previous two verses have Satan more in his early Old Testament role of what Albright and Mann refer to as the "opposing council," one who works for God by testing the faithful. In this verse he presents himself as the more modern adversary of God.

As with the previous temptations there are various theories as to its meaning. The traditional view that developed in the Middle Ages was that the devil was simply testing Jesus with the sin of avarice. Most modern scholars reject this sin based interpretation. A second theory that was popular for some time, and is still held by many, is that the temptation narrative represents Jesus rejecting alternate views of the messiah. In this verse Satan is tempting Jesus to become a political figure rather than a spiritual one. Many Jews expected the messiah would be both a spiritual and political liberator who would lead the Jewish people to freedom from the Romans and dominion over the world. Why Jesus did not do so was an important discussion in the early church. This temptation is thus theorized as a demonstration that Jesus seeking political power would have been following the will of Satan. A third theory that is popular today is to see the temptation narrative as one of Jesus not making the same mistakes as the Israelites did. France notes that many times since the Exodus the Israelites had compromised their principles for political goals and in this verse Jesus makes clear he will not do the same. Schweizer proposes that the temptation might include elements of both the later two interpretations. As with the rest of the temptation narrative this section is believed to have been taken from Q. Schweizer notes that at the time Q was written the central political issue in the region would have been the First Jewish–Roman War. The small Christian community did not join the Zealots in the revolt and Schweizer feels that Q thus focused on justifying this decision by focusing on the unimportance of politics compared to the spiritual. By the time the Gospel of Matthew was written the Revolt had faded from prominence, Matthew thus adapted the section to fit more closely with his theme of Jesus as the culmination of Jewish history, but preserved some elements of the original argument in Q.

== Commentary from the Church Fathers ==
Jerome: "An arrogant and vain vaunt; for he hath not the power to bestow all kingdoms, since many of the saints have, we know, been made kings by God."

Pseudo-Chrysostom: "But such things as are gotten by iniquity in this world, as riches, for instance, gained by fraud or perjury, these the Devil bestows. The Devil therefore cannot give riches to whom he will, but to those only who are willing to receive them of him."

Saint Remigius: "Wonderful infatuation in the Devil! To promise earthly kingdoms to Him who gives heavenly kingdoms to His faithful people, and the glory of earth to Him who is Lord of the glory of heaven!"

Ambrose: "Ambition has its dangers at home; that it may govern, it is first others’ slave; it bows in flattery that it may rule in honour; and while it would be exalted, it is made to stoop."

Glossa Ordinaria: "See the Devil’s pride as of old. In the beginning, he sought to make himself equal with God, now he seeks to usurp the honours due to God, saying, If you will fall down and worship me. Who then worships the Devil must first fall down."

Preceded by Matthew 4:8	Gospel of Matthew; Chapter 4	Succeeded by Matthew 4:10
