= Matthew 4:20 =

- ← 4:19 4:21 →
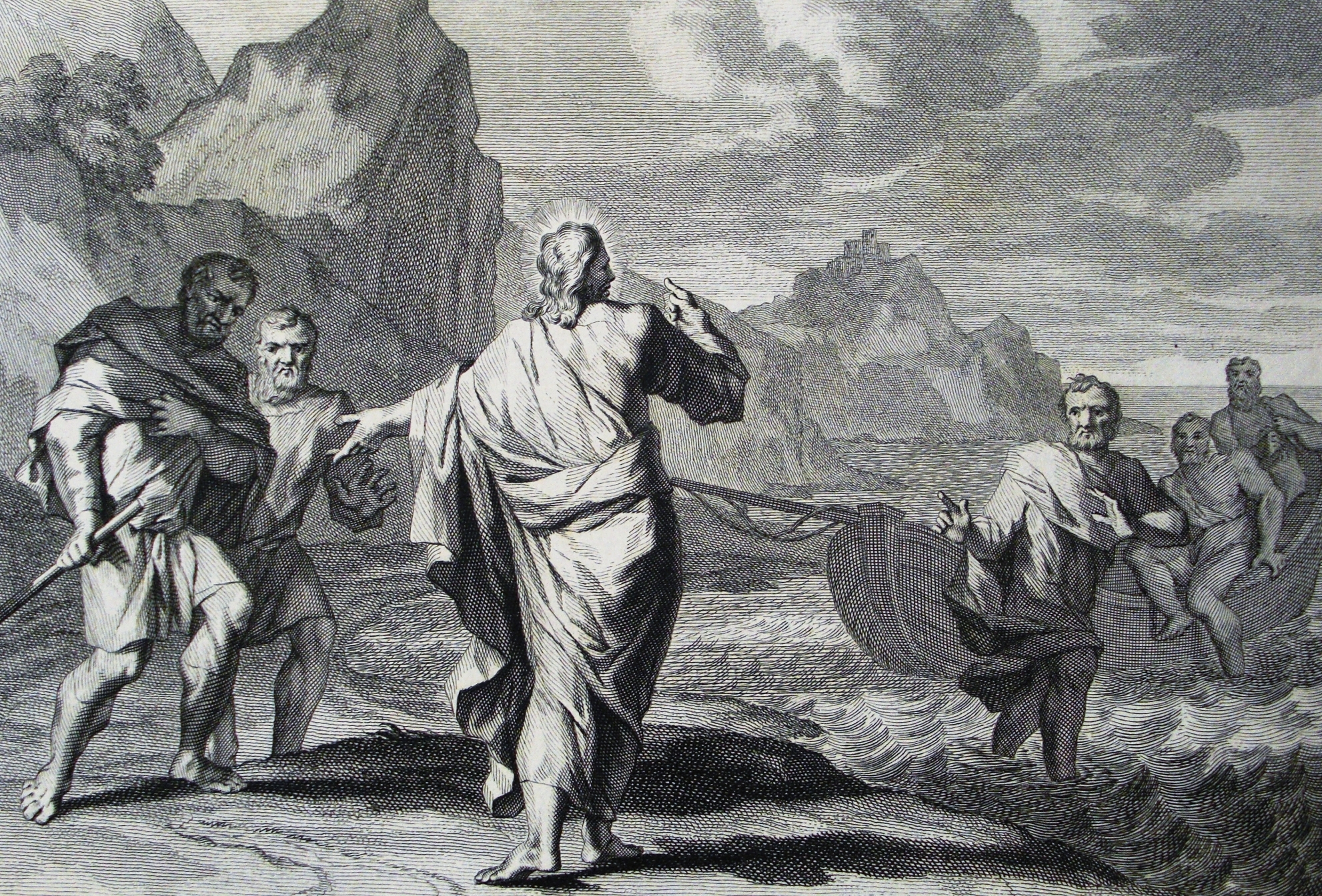
- "Simon Peter & Andrew with Christ" by Pieter van der Borcht (ca. 1540-1608)
- Book: Gospel of Matthew
- Christian Bible part: New Testament

Matthew 4:20 is the twentieth verse of the fourth chapter of the Gospel of Matthew in the New Testament. Jesus has just begun preaching in Galilee and has encountered the fishermen Simon Peter and Andrew. He has called them to follow him as "fishers of men", and in this verse the pair take up his offer.

== Content ==
The original Koine Greek, according to Westcott and Hort, reads:

οι δε ευθεως αφεντες τα δικτυα ηκολουθησαν αυτω

In the King James Version of the Bible, the text reads:

And they straightway left their nets, and followed him.

The World English Bible translates the passage as:

They immediately left their nets and followed him.

For a collection of other versions see Biblehub Matthew 4:20.

== Analysis ==
The traditional view is that the decision to join Jesus after this brief meeting was an example of his divine power. France, however, notes that this view is not explicit in the Gospel and that the alternate view that Jesus knew, and was even close friends, with both men beforehand is perfectly possible. John 1 and Luke 5:3 imply this version of events. Clarke notes that as a carpenter, one of Jesus' tasks might very well have been building and repairing fishing vessels and he thus had many opportunities to interact and befriend fishermen such as Simon and Andrew.

Albright and Mann note that Matthew consistently emphasizes the importance of renunciation in coming to Jesus, as represented by the fishers' abandonment of their nets. Fishing was a profitable, but capital intensive, occupation and abandoning everything would have been an important sacrifice. Clarke notes that this abandonment of worldly possessions was taken as a model by later Christian ascetics.

== Commentary from the Church Fathers ==
Gregory the Great: (Hom. in Evan. v. 1.) Peter and Andrew had seen Christ work no miracle, had heard from him no word of the promise of the eternal reward, yet at this single bidding of the Lord they forgot all that they had seemed to possess, and straightway left their nets, and followed Him. In which deed we ought rather to consider their wills than the amount of their property. He leaves much who keeps nothing for himself, he parts with much, who with his possessions renounces his lusts. Those who followed Christ gave up enough to be coveted by those who did not follow. Our outward goods, however small, are enough for the Lord; He does not weigh the sacrifice by how much is offered, but out of how much it is offered. The kingdom of God is not to be valued at a certain price, but whatever a man has, much or little, is equally available.

Pseudo-Chrysostom: These disciples did not follow Christ from desire of the honour of a doctor, but because they coveted the labour itself; they knew how precious is the soul of man, how pleasant to God is his salvation, and how great its reward.

Chrysostom: To so great a promise they trusted, and believed that they should catch others by those same words by which themselves had been caught.

Pseudo-Chrysostom: These were their desires, for which they left all and followed; teaching us thereby that none can possess earthly things and perfectly attain to heavenly things.

Preceded by Matthew 4:19	Gospel of Matthew; Chapter 4	Succeeded by Matthew 4:21
