= Matthew 4:19 =

- ← 4:18 4:20 →
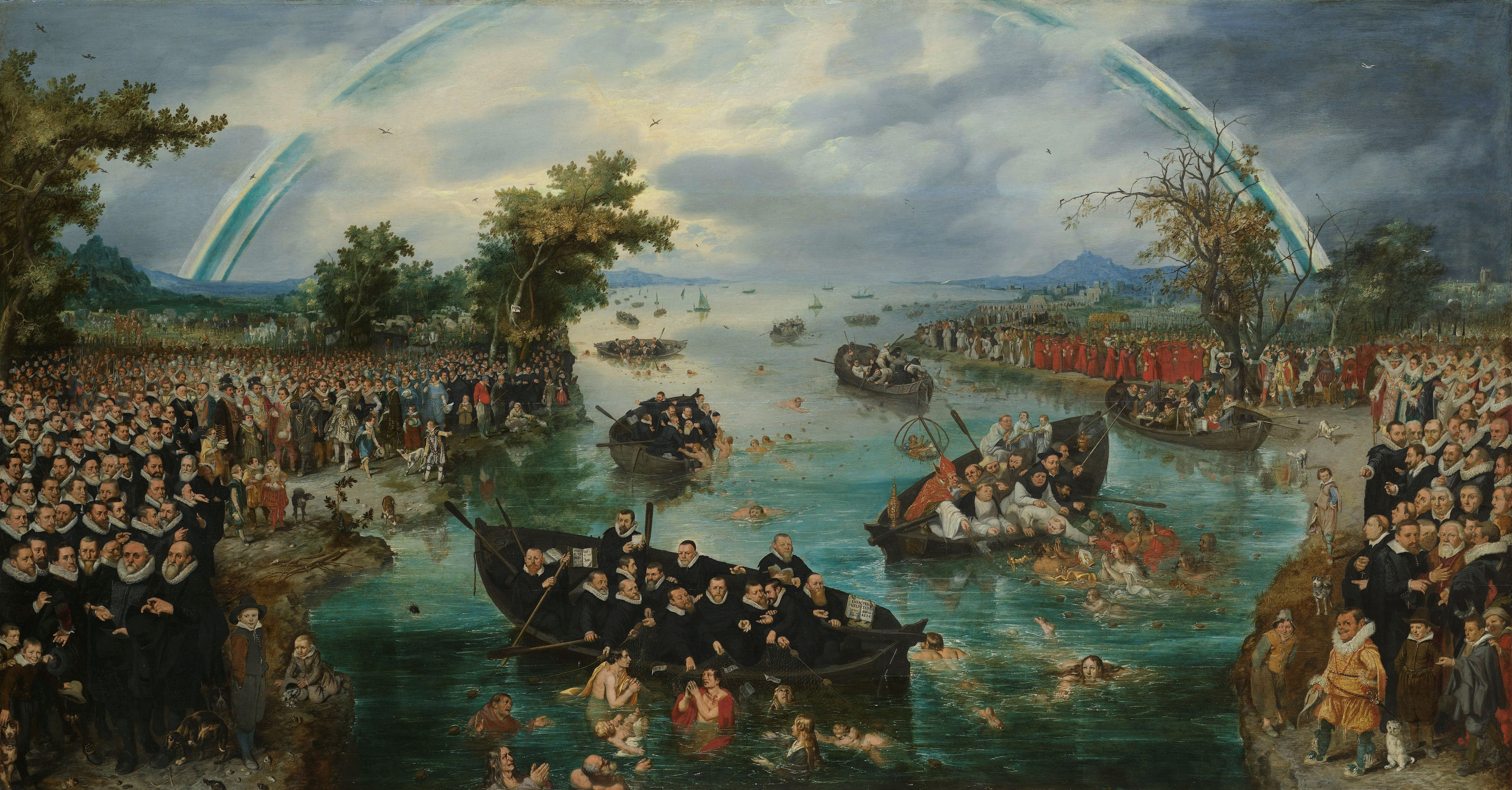
- Adriaen van de Venne's Fishing for Souls, Oil on panel (1614)
- Book: Gospel of Matthew
- Christian Bible part: New Testament

Matthew 4:19 is the nineteenth verse of the fourth chapter of the Gospel of Matthew in the New Testament. Jesus has just begun preaching in Galilee and has encountered the fishermen Simon Peter and Andrew. In this verse he calls the pair to follow him.

== Content ==
The original Koine Greek, according to Westcott and Hort, reads:

και λεγει αυτοις δευτε οπισω μου
και ποιησω υμας αλιεις ανθρωπων

In the King James Version of the Bible, the text reads:

And he saith unto them, Follow me,
and I will make you fishers of men.

The World English Bible translates the passage as:

He said to them, "Come after me,
and I will make you fishers for men."

For a collection of other versions see BibleHub Matthew 4:19.

== Analysis ==
=== Follow me ===
The term "follow me" refers to following as a disciple would a Rabbi. Any good Rabbi or teacher would have a group of disciples around him learning and doing tasks for their master. France notes that Jesus' statement is unusual as it invites the disciples to take an active part in his ministry. While both Greek and Jewish religious leaders were traditionally surrounded by a group of disciples it was more common for the disciples to search out a teacher, and for a teacher to express indifference to their followers. This verse clearly depicts Jesus' actively recruiting his followers.

=== Fishers of men ===
The phrase "fishers of men", also at Mark 1:17, is one of the most well known lines in the entire New Testament, and the metaphor for evangelism. The image probably had an important role in the adoption of the Ichthys as a symbol of early Christianity. The reference has also often been moved from the disciples to Jesus, with him being called the "fisher of men", and the image of Jesus as a fisherman is second only to that of Jesus as a shepherd.

The translation "fishers of men" is well known and used by most authors, but not wholly accurate in a modern context, inasmuch as the original Greek is gender neutral. Translators also prefer to avoid the word fisher, since fisherman has replaced it as the standard term in English, though in recent years fisher has gained some currency as a gender neutral term for fishermen.

A similar reference to fishing occurs at Jeremiah 16:16, upon which this passage might be based. In Jeremiah the reference is to hunting down sinners: in the Gospels it seems to be a milder metaphor of saving souls. The basic interpretation of the metaphor as referring to the disciples working to catch souls for Jesus as they had previously caught fish is universally agreed upon, there are, however, a number of views of the exact meaning of the metaphor. The metaphor has a somewhat different meaning depending on one's view of the type of fishing the disciples participated in. Wallace argues that the common view of fishing with a line and hook and bringing each fish in individually is misplaced, Simon and Andrew would have used nets to fish and would have brought in large numbers of fish at once through grand acts. Wuellner presents an alternate view, arguing that the disciples may have caught fish individually, and even by hand. Jindrich Manek believes that to fully appreciate the metaphor one must understand how the sea was viewed at the time. He argues that throughout the Old Testament the sea is presented as unholy, to create life God first needed to push away the seas, and in stories, such as that of Jonah, the depths of the sea are portrayed as being synonymous with the underworld. Thus the act of fishing brings the fish from the domain of sin and death to that of God. Similarly the disciples are tasked with bringing souls from sin and evil into the domain of God. The water reference might also be linked to the idea of baptism, which in Matthew 28:19 is explicitly linked to the disciples' mission.

Manek also notes that some question whether the metaphor has the universal meaning that is usually understood. Some scholars believe that Jesus only called Simon and Andrew to be fishers because they already had these skills, that is Jesus had met a teacher he would have asked them to teach for him and if he had met a soldier he would have asked him to do battle for him.

== Commentary from the Church Fathers ==
Glossa Ordinaria: Follow me, not so much with your feet as in your hearts and your life.

Pseudo-Chrysostom: Fishers of men, that is, teachers, that with the net of God's word you may catch men out of this world of storm and danger, in which men do not walk but are rather borne along, the Devil by pleasure drawing them into sin where men devour one another as the stronger fishes do the weaker, withdrawn from hence they may live upon the land, being made members of Christ's body.

== Literary usage ==
The words of this famous verse have appeared a number of times in art and culture. Literary works which refer to the verse include Geoffrey Chaucer's "Summoner's Tale", Byron's Don Juan, Tennyson's Harold, Joyce's A Portrait of the Artist as a Young Man, and G.K. Chesterton's "The Innocence of Father Brown".

== Bibliography ==
- Carson, D.A., "The Limits of Functional Equivalence in Bible Translation - and other Limits Too", The Challenge of Bible Translation: Communicating God's Word to the World. edited by Glen G Scorgie, Mark L. Strauss, Steven M. Voth.

Preceded by Matthew 4:18	Gospel of Matthew; Chapter 4	Succeeded by Matthew 4:20
