= Matthew 4:12 =

- ← 4:11 4:13 →
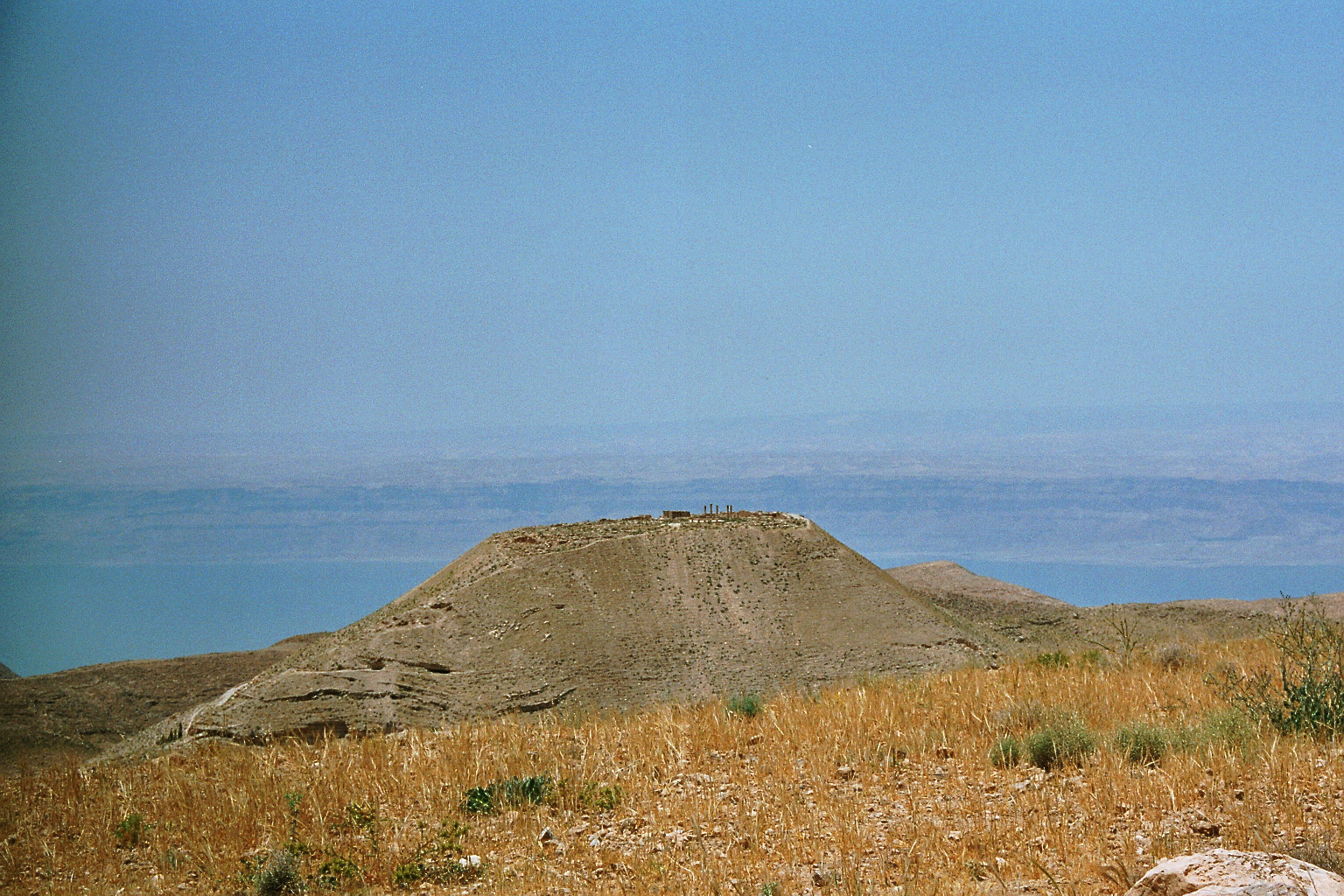
- Ruins of Fortress Machaerus on the hilltop with the Dead Sea in the background. John the Baptist was imprisoned and executed here, according to Josephus.
- Book: Gospel of Matthew
- Christian Bible part: New Testament

Matthew 4:12 is the twelfth verse of the fourth chapter of the Gospel of Matthew in the New Testament. The temptation scene has just ended, and this verse begins the introduction to the discussion of the Ministry of Jesus, which makes up the bulk of the gospel narrative. Jesus' ministry in Galilee extends from this verse as far as Matthew 18:35.

== Content ==
The text in Koine Greek, according to the Textus Receptus, reads:

Ἀκούσας δὲ ὁ Ἰησοῦς ὅτι Ἰωάννης παρεδόθη ἀνεχώρησεν εἰς τὴν Γαλιλαίαν

In the King James Version of the Bible, the text reads:

Now when Jesus had heard that John was
cast into prison, he departed into Galilee;

The World English Bible translates this verse as:

Now when Jesus heard that John was
delivered up, he withdrew into Galilee.

For a collection of other versions, see BibleHub Matthew 4:12.

== Textual witnesses ==
Some early manuscripts containing the text of this verse in Greek are:

- Papyrus 102 (3rd century)
- Codex Vaticanus (325-350)
- Codex Sinaiticus (330-360)
- Codex Bezae (~400)
- Codex Washingtonianus (~400)
- Codex Ephraemi Rescriptus (~450)

== Analysis ==
According to the theory of Markan Priority, this verse is based closely on the very similar Mark 1:14. The verse refers to John the Baptist, the central character of Matthew 3, and to his arrest by Herod Antipas. The Gospel of Matthew does not go into greater detail about John's arrest until chapter 14.

Although verse 11 refers to the end of Jesus' period of temptation in the wilderness, there is not necessarily an immediate connection between this episode and his return north from Judea to Galilee, where he had lived since his childhood. E. H. Plumptre argues that "there is a great break", although he sees some of the events of John's opening chapters filling this gap. However, Heinrich Meyer holds that "a longer intervening period between the temptation and the return to Galilee is not hinted at by Matthew (nor even by Mark)", and he notes that Luke's narrative (Luke 4:13-14) more closely connects the defeat of the tempter with Jesus' return north. Jones, and most others readers, believe that some months likely elapsed. There is no historical record of exactly when John was arrested, which would clarify the dating.

Jesus had left Galilee to be baptized in Matthew 3:13. Schweizer notes that the text does not make clear that the arrest of John the Baptist was the cause of Jesus' return to Galilee, only that the two events occurred at the same time. However, France notes that the word withdrew in Matthew almost always refers to a retreat from hostile forces, implying that is what is happening here. Both Judea and Galilee were under the control of Herod Antipas at this point, so unlike Matthew 2:22 this is not a move to the domain of a different ruler, but it is perfectly plausible that distant Galilee would be safer for John's followers than the area around the Jordan.

Matthew also says nothing about what occurred between the temptation and arrest of John. Jesus is often portrayed as serving as one of John's disciples during this period. France agrees with this theory. He thus sees the arrest as causing an important change in Jesus' ministry. In the area by the Jordan it is presumed that Jesus adopted John's baptism-based ministry. France argues the flight to Galilee induced a transition to a ministry based on itinerant preaching.

The term translated as "cast into prison", or more accurately "delivered up", is one that will reappear frequently in the reports of Jesus' own imprisonment. Though Nolland notes that Matthew does not contain the same extensive John/Jesus parallels as Mark.

== Commentary from the Church Fathers ==
Rabanus Maurus: Matthew having related the forty days’ fast, the temptation of Christ, and the ministry of Angels, proceeds, Jesus having heard that John was cast into prison.

Pseudo-Chrysostom: By God without doubt, for none can effect anything against a holy man, unless God deliver him up. He withdrew into Galilee, that is, out of Judæa; both that He might reserve His passion to the fit time, and that He might set us an example of flying from danger.

Chrysostom: It is not blameworthy not to throw one's self into peril, but when one has fallen into it, not to endure manfully. He departed from Judæa both to soften Jewish animosity, and to fulfil a prophecy, seeking moreover to fish for those masters of the world who dwelt in Galilee. Note also how when He would depart to the Gentiles, He received good cause from the Jews; His forerunner was thrown into prison, which compelled Jesus to pass into Galilee of the Gentiles.

Preceded by Matthew 4:11	Gospel of Matthew; Chapter 4	Succeeded by Matthew 4:13
