= Matthew 4:6 =

- ← 4:5 4:7 →
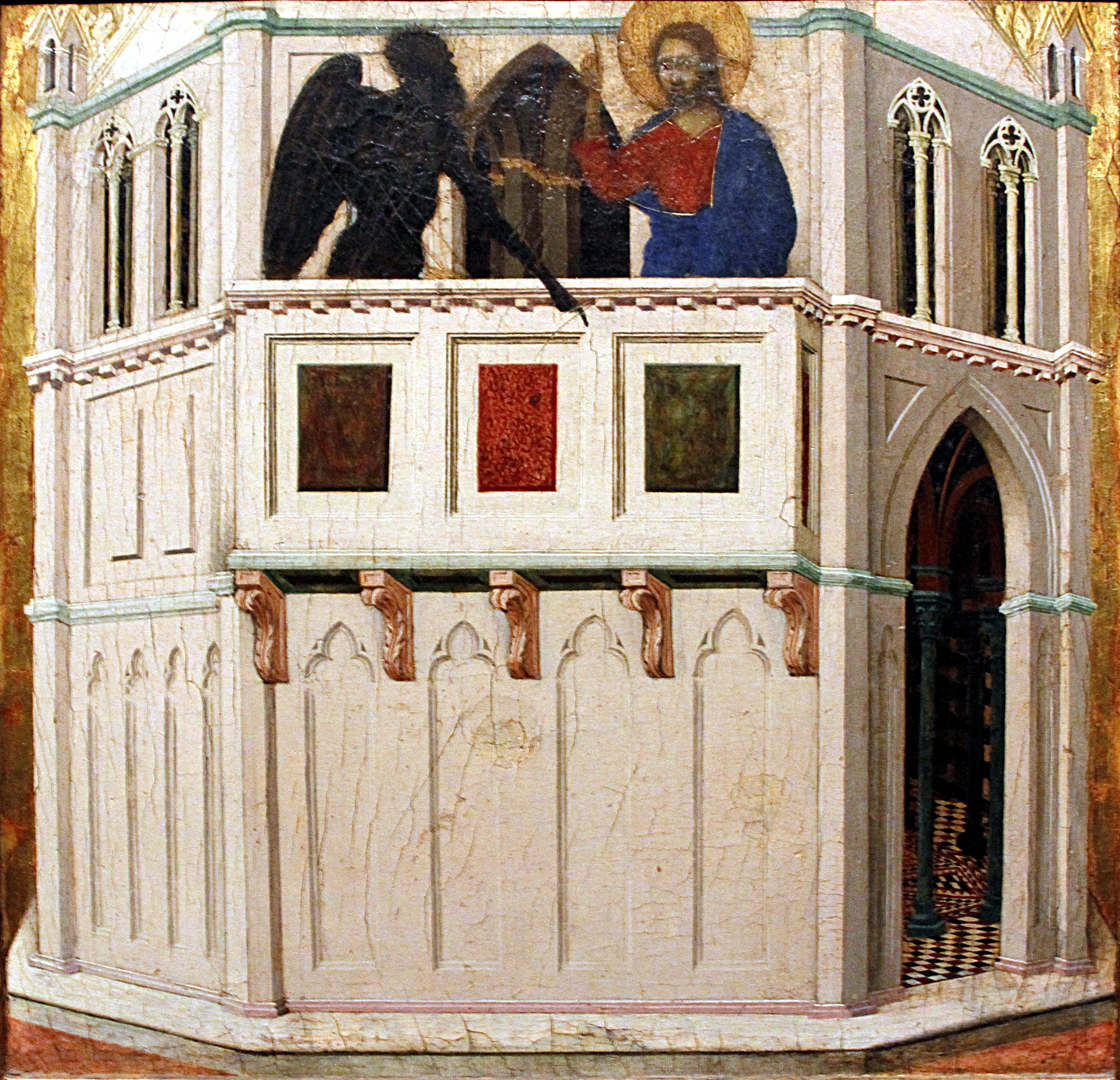
- Duccio's depiction of the temptation on the temple
- Book: Gospel of Matthew
- Christian Bible part: New Testament

Matthew 4:6 is the sixth verse of the fourth chapter of the Gospel of Matthew in the New Testament. Jesus has just rebuffed "the tempter's" first temptation; in this verse, the devil presents Jesus with a second temptation while they are standing on the pinnacle of the temple in the "holy city" (Jerusalem).

== Text ==
In the King James Version of the Bible, the text reads:

And saith unto him, If thou be the
Son of God, cast thyself down: for it
is written, He shall give his angels
charge concerning thee: and in their
hands they shall bear thee up, lest at any
time thou dash thy foot against a stone.

The World English Bible translates the passage as:

and said to him, "If you are the
Son of God, throw yourself down, for
it is written, ‘He will put his angels
in charge of you.’ and,‘On their hands
they will bear you up, so that you
don’t dash your foot against a stone.’

The 1881 Westcott-Hort Greek text is:

και λεγει αυτω ει υιος ει του θεου βαλε σεαυτον κατω
γεγραπται γαρ οτι
τοις αγγελοις αυτου εντελειται περι σου
και επι χειρων αρουσιν σε μηποτε προσκοψης προς λιθον τον ποδα σου

For a collection of other versions see BibleHub Matthew 4:6

== Commentary ==
As with Matthew 4:3, Satan is not doubting that Jesus is the Son of God but rather is stating that he should do these things because he is the Son of God. Satan here is trying to convince Jesus to throw himself from the pinnacle of the temple because God has promised that he will not be hurt. To advance this temptation the devil quotes scripture, something Swiss theologian Eduard Schweizer sees as an escalation over the first temptation.

The verse quoted is taken from the eleventh and twelfth verses of Psalm 91. In the KJV, those verses read:

For he will command his angels concerning you
to guard you in all your ways;
they will lift you up in their hands,
so that you will not strike your foot against a stone.

The quotation omits the line "to guard you in all your ways". Robert Gundry notes that the original wording makes it clear that God is promising only to protect from accidents, not from deliberate acts such as the one Satan is proposing.

The exact evil Satan is trying to induce in this verse is open to debate. The traditional view was that the temptation narrative was one of rejecting sin and this test was simply Satan luring Jesus with the sin of hubris. Most modern scholars reject this view of the temptation. A view that was popular for a time was that the three temptation sequences each represent Jesus rejecting one vision of what the Messiah should be. In this verse Satan tries to convince him that he should be a magician and miracle worker who wins converts by his spectacular acts. Gundry notes that the choice of the Temple as a setting is evidence for this theory. There are many precipices in the wilderness, that Satan brings him to the top of the temple implies that the miraculous rescue would be a very public act. A view that is in vogue today is that Satan is placing before Jesus the same pitfalls that the Jewish people fell into during the period after Exodus. In the desert the Israelites attempted to test God and Satan is proposing that Jesus do the same. This interpretation fits most closely with Jesus' response to this temptation in the next verse.

== Commentary from the Church Fathers ==
Jerome: "In the several temptations the single aim of the Devil is to find if He be the Son of God, but he is so answered as at last to depart in doubt; He says, Cast thyself, because the voice of the Devil, which is always calling men downwards, has power to persuade them, but may not compel them to fall."

Pseudo-Chrysostom: "How does he expect to discover by this proposition whether He be the Son of God or not? For to fly through the air is not proper to the Divine nature, for it is not useful to any. If then any were to attempt to fly when challenged to it, he would be acting from ostentation, and would so belong rather to the Devil than to God. If it is enough to a wise man to be what he is, and he has no wish to seem what he is not, how much more should the Son of God hold it not necessary to show what He is; He of whom none can know so much as He is in Himself?"

Ambrose: "But as Satan transfigures himself into an Angel of light, and spreads a snare for the faithful, even from the divine Scriptures, so now he uses its texts, not to instruct but to receive."

Jerome: "This verse we read in the ninetieth Psalm (Ps. 91:11.), but that is a prophecy not of Christ, but of some holy man, so the Devil interprets Scripture amiss."

Pseudo-Chrysostom: "For the Son of God in truth is not borne of Angels, but Himself bears them, or if He be borne in their arms, it is not from weakness, lest He dash His foot against a stone, but for the honour. O thou Devil, thou hast read that the Son of God is borne in Angels’ arms, hast thou not also read that He shall tread upon the asp and basilisk? But the one text he brings forward as proud, the other he omits as crafty."

Chrysostom: "Observe that Scripture is brought forward by the Lord only with an apt meaning, but by the Devil irreverently; for that where it is written, He shall give his Angels charge over thee, is not an exhortation to cast Himself headlong."

Glossa Ordinaria: "We must explain thus; Scripture says of any good man, that He has given it in charge to His Angels, that is to His ministering spirits, to bear him in their hands, i. e. by their aid to guard him that he dash not his foot against a stone, i. e. keep his heart that it stumble not at the old law written in tables of stone. Or by the stone may be understood every occasion of sin and error."

Rabanus Maurus: "though our Saviour suffered Himself to be placed by the Devil on a pinnacle of the temple, yet refused to come down also at his command, giving us an example, that whosoever bids us ascend the strait way of truth we should obey. But if he would again cast us down from the height of truth and virtue to the depth of error we should not hearken to him."

Jerome: "The false Scripture darts of the Devil He brands with the true shield of Scripture."

Preceded by Matthew 4:5	Gospel of Matthew; Chapter 4	Succeeded by Matthew 4:7
