= Zebedee =

Father of James and John, two disciples of Jesus

Saint Zebedee
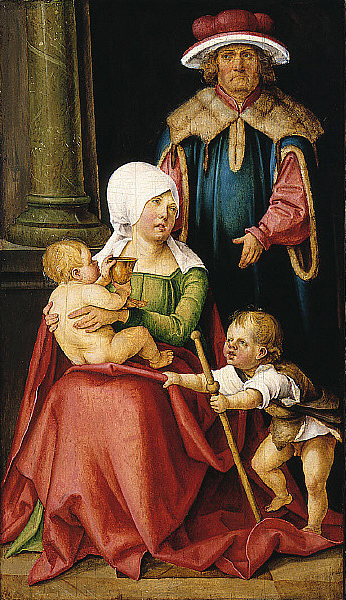
- Hans von Kulmbach, Mary Salome and Zebedee with their Sons James the Greater and John the Evangelist, c. 1511

Fisherman, Righteous
- Born: 1st century BC
- Residence: Capernaum
- Died: 1st century AD
- Honored in: Catholic Church
- Feast: 15 March

Zebedee (/ˈzɛbɪdiː/ ZEH-bih-dee; Ancient Greek: Ζεβεδαῖος, romanized: Zebedaîos; Hebrew: זְבַדְיָה, romanized: Zəḇaḏyâ), according to the synoptic gospels, was the father of James and John, two apostles of Jesus. The gospels also suggest that he was the husband of Salome; whereas Mark 15:40 names the women present at the crucifixion as "Mary Magdalene, and Mary the mother of James and of Joses, and Salome," the parallel passage in Matthew 27:56 has "Mary Magdalene, and Mary the mother of James and Joses, and the mother of Zebedee's children." The Catholic Encyclopedia concludes that the Salome of Mark 15:40 is probably identical with the mother of the sons of Zebedee in Matthew.

Zebedee was presumably a fisherman, "probably of some means." Although named several times in the gospels, the only times he actually appears are in Matthew 4:21-22 and Mark 1:19–20, where he is left in the boat after Jesus called James and John. Mark's note that Zebedee was left with the "hired men" implies the family had some wealth. Zebedee lived at or near Bethsaida.

== Etymology ==
The name given in the Gospels, Ζεβεδαῖος, is probably a transliteration of the Hebrew name Zəḇaḏyâ according to Spiros Zodhiates (The Complete Wordstudy Dictionary), or the truncated version Zabdî (זַבְדִּי), says BDB Theological Dictionary, and so means "Yahweh (or the Lord) has bestowed". Other popular interpretations of the name are: "abundant" (Hitchcock's Bible Names Dictionary) or "my gift" (Smith's Bible Dictionary).

== Veneration ==
Zebedaeus is venerated in the Roman Catholic Church as a saint. His feast day is 15 March.

== See also ==
- Mary Salome and Zebedee
