= Matthew 4:4 =

- ← 4:3 4:5 →
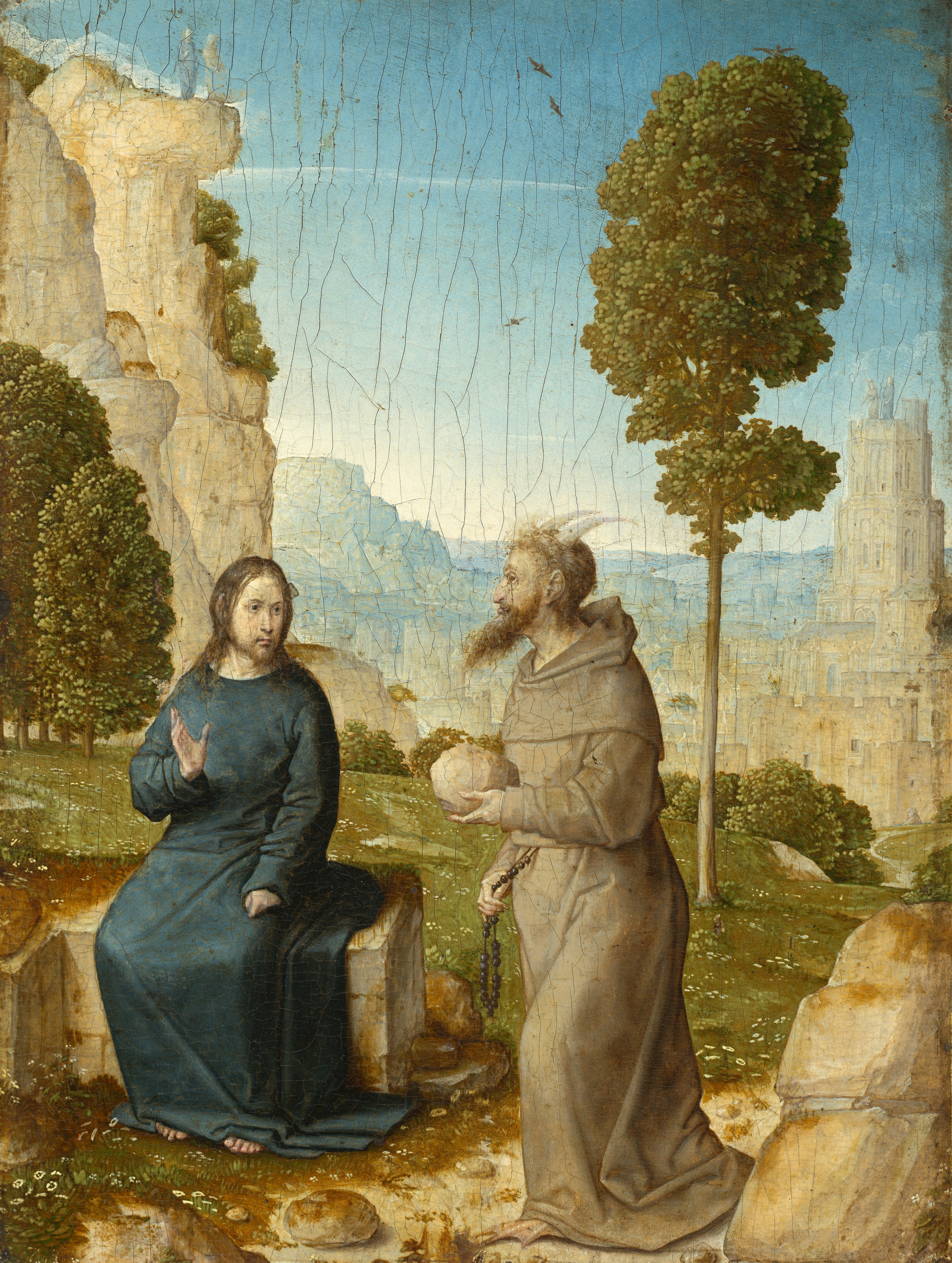
- Juan de Flandes' The Temptation of Christ in the Wilderness shows Jesus rebuffing Satan's proffered stone
- Book: Gospel of Matthew
- Christian Bible part: New Testament

Matthew 4:4 is the fourth verse of the fourth chapter of the Gospel of Matthew in the New Testament. Jesus, who has been fasting in the desert, has just been tempted by Satan to make bread from stones to relieve his hunger, and in this verse he rejects this idea.

== Content ==
In the King James Version of the Bible the text reads:

But he answered and said, It is
written, Man shall not live by
bread alone, but by every word that
proceedeth out of the mouth of God.

The World English Bible translates the passage as:

But he answered, "It is written,
‘Man shall not live by bread alone,
but by every word that proceeds
out of the mouth of God.’"

The 1881 Westcott-Hort Greek text is:

ο δε αποκριθεις ειπεν
γεγραπται ουκ επ αρτω μονω ζησεται ο ανθρωπος
αλλ επι παντι ρηματι εκπορευομενω δια στοματος θεου

For a collection of other versions see BibleHub Matthew 4:4

== Analysis ==
Jesus rebuts Satan's advances by quoting scripture. The verse in question is from Deuteronomy 8:3. In its original context the verse is describing how while wandering through the wilderness in Exodus the Israelites lacked food. Despite God's promises they complained and worried about their hunger, but in the end God provided manna to feed them all. This same reply is also quoted in Luke 4:4, though in Luke it is somewhat abbreviated, not containing "but by every word that proceeds out of the mouth of God." The quote uses the exact wording of the Septuagint, but Hill notes that it is not an exact translation of the original Hebrew which has "everything" rather than "every word." Gundry feels the author of Matthew added this section to emphasize Jesus' obedience to God. Jones states that by replying with nothing but quotes from scripture, Jesus illustrates his "perfect detachment from everything except God's will."

Jesus rejects Satan's idea, and uses nothing but a word of scripture as his argument. France notes that God's word would not literally make up for not having any food. Instead it is a question of priority. If God instructed Jesus to fast in the desert, then it is that word that must be followed and it takes priority over any feelings such as hunger.

There are a number of explanations for why Satan attempted to have Jesus turn stones into bread and why it was important that Jesus refuse. The act of using God's powers to create bread is not in itself wrong, as demonstrated in Matthew 14 and 15 where Jesus actually does perform this miracle. In the Middle Ages it became common to argue that Satan was simply tempting Christ into gluttony. Most modern scholars do not accept this view. France notes that tempt should better be translated as test that Satan was testing Jesus' understanding of his role rather than luring him into evil. Jones notes that calling someone who has fasted for forty days gluttonous because they want food is not very fair. Most modern scholars thus reject the sin explanation. Another view that was popular for a time was that this represented Jesus rejecting the role of the "economic messiah": that in this verse he demonstrates that it is not his role to feed the hungry of the world, but rather to provide spiritual sustenance. The most popular view today is that this passage echoes the history of Israel. The quote itself comes from the part of the Old Testament describing the period after the Exodus when the Israelites were wandering hungry in the wilderness and complaining about their hunger. This verse is seen to demonstrate that Jesus does not make the same mistake they did and accepts that God will ensure his safety.

=== Metaphorical extensions ===
The phrase "Man shall not live by bread alone" is today a common expression meaning that people need more than material things to truly live. However, it is also sometimes used in almost the opposite sense to justify material luxuries beyond simple things like bread.

Fortna notes that the word usually translated as man would more accurately be replaced by human beings as in the original Greek it is gender neutral.

== Commentary from the Church Fathers ==
Jerome: "Christ’s purpose was to vanquish by humility."

Pope Leo I: "Hence he opposed the adversary rather by testimonies out of the Law, than by miraculous powers; thus at the same time giving more honour to man, and more disgrace to the adversary, when the enemy of the human race thus seemed to be overcome by man rather than by God."

Gregory the Great: "So the Lord when tempted by the Devil answered only with precepts of Holy Writ, and He who could have drowned His tempter in the abyss, displayed not the might of His power; giving us an example, that when we suffer anything at the hands of evil men, we should be stirred up to learning rather than to revenge."

Pseudo-Chrysostom: "He said not, ‘I live not,’ but, Man doth not live by bread alone, that the Devil might still ask, If thou be the Son of God. If He be God, it is as though He shunned to display what He had power to do; if man, it is a crafty will that His want of power should not be detected."

Rabanus Maurus: "This verse is quoted from Deuteronomy (c. 8:3). Whoso then feeds not on the Word of God, he lives not; as the body of man cannot live without earthly food, so cannot his soul without God’s word. This word is said to proceed out of the mouth of God, where he reveals His will by Scripture testimonies."

== See also ==
- Seek Ye First

Preceded by Matthew 4:3	Gospel of Matthew; Chapter 4	Succeeded by Matthew 4:5
