= Matthew 4:23 =

- ← 4:22 4:24 →
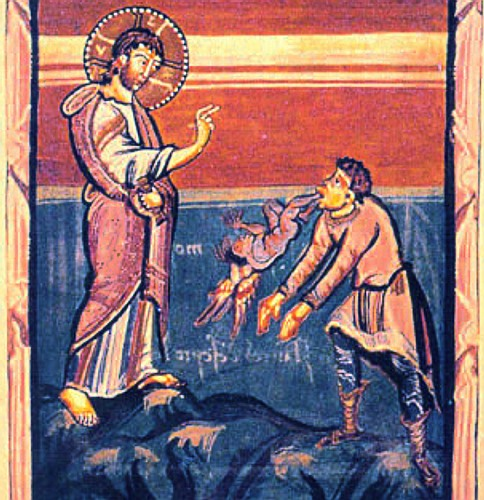
- Jesus healing the demon possessed
- Book: Gospel of Matthew
- Christian Bible part: New Testament

Matthew 4:23 is the twenty-third verse of the fourth chapter of the Gospel of Matthew in the New Testament. Jesus has just recruited the first four disciples, this verse begins a brief summary of and introduction to Jesus' ministry in Galilee that will be recounted in the next several chapters.

== Content ==
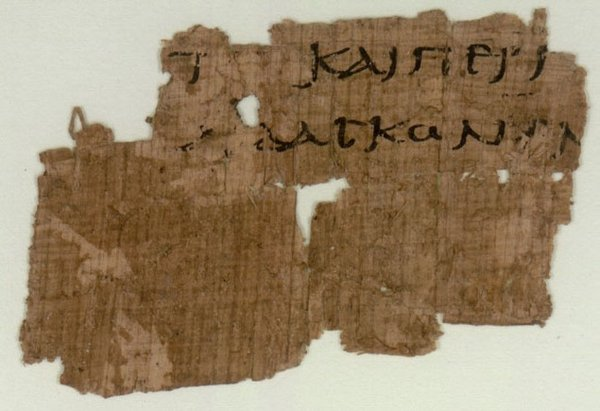
Matthew 4:22-23 on Papyrus 102 (3rd century).

The text in Koine Greek, according to Westcott and Hort, reads:

και περιηγεν εν ολη τη γαλιλαια διδασκων εν ταις συναγωγαις
αυτων και κηρυσσων το ευαγγελιον της βασιλειας και θεραπευων
πασαν νοσον και πασαν μαλακιαν εν τω λαω

In the King James Version of the Bible the text reads:

And Jesus went about all Galilee, teaching in their synagogues,
and preaching the gospel of the kingdom, and healing all manner
of sickness and all manner of disease among the people.

The World English Bible translates the passage as:

Jesus went about in all Galilee, teaching in their synagogues,
preaching the Good News of the Kingdom, and healing every
disease and every sickness among the people

For a collection of other versions see BibleHub Matthew 4:23

== Analysis ==
This verse outlines Jesus' life as an itinerant preacher in Galilee. It divides his ministry into three sections: teaching, preaching, and healing. Unlike the other Gospels, the author of Matthew makes a clear distinction between teaching and preaching. To him teaching is only commentary on the scripture and the laws, while preaching is public proclamation. According to France, the third form, healing, is to provide clear illustration of the power of God.

The mention of teaching in synagogues is especially noteworthy. While this Gospel and others have a large number of scenes of Jesus preaching and healing, none depict him teaching in a synagogue. Clarke notes that Jesus being permitted to speak in a synagogue would indicate that he was a respected figure and also that he could speak Hebrew in addition to the Aramaic that was the common language of the area.

Jesus preaches the gospel of the kingdom, literally the good news of the kingdom. France feels this is based on John the Baptist's message of the coming Kingdom of Heaven in Matthew 3:2 that Jesus later adopts in Matthew 4:1. France states that while John was preaching about the kingdom coming in the near future, Jesus now reports that it is in the present.

The Greek text literally translates as Jesus healing "all the sickness and disease among the people." This literal translation conflicts with everything else that is known about Jesus' healing that describes it as individual. A more probable interpretation is that Jesus healed "all types of disease," and this is how the verse is normally translated.

Albright and Mann note that the term "the people" occurs fourteen times in Matthew, and that it is almost always short for "the Jewish people." This interpretation is reinforced by later parts of the Gospels that portray the healing of Gentiles as an unusual event. Despite Galilee's large Gentile proportion, it seems as though Jesus' ministry was mostly confined to Jews. The mention of synagogues also reinforces this impression.

== Textual witnesses ==
Some early manuscripts containing the text of this verse in Greek are:

- Papyrus 102 (3rd century)
- Codex Vaticanus (325–350)
- Codex Sinaiticus (330–360)
- Codex Bezae (~400)
- Codex Washingtonianus (~400)
- Codex Ephraemi Rescriptus (~450)

== Commentary from the Church Fathers ==
Pseudo-Chrysostom: Kings, when about to go to war with their enemies, first gather an army, and so go out to battle; thus the Lord, when about to war against the Devil, first collected Apostles, and then began to preach the Gospel.

Saint Remigius: An example of life for doctors; that they should not be inactive, they are instructed in these words, And Jesus went about.

Pseudo-Chrysostom: Because they being weak could not come to their physician, He as a zealous Physician went about to visit those who had any grievous sickness. The Lord went round the several regions, and after His example, the pastors of each region ought to go round to study the several dispositions of their people, that for the remedy of each disease some medicine may be found in the Church.

Saint Remigius: That they should not be acceptors of persons the preachers are instructed in what follows, the whole of Galilee. That they should not go about empty, by the word teaching. That they should seek to benefit not few but many, in what follows, in their synagogues.

Chrysostom:a By which too He showed the Jews that He came not as an enemy of God, or a seducer of souls, but as consenting with his Father.

Saint Remigius: That they should not preach error nor fable, but sound doctrine, is inculcated in the words, preaching the Gospel of the kingdom. ‘Teaching’ and ‘preaching’ differ; teaching refers to things present, preaching to things to come; He taught present commandments and preached future promises.

Pseudo-Chrysostom: Or, He taught natural righteousness, those things which natural reason teaches, as chastity, humility, and the like, which all men of themselves see to be goods. Such things are necessary to be taught not so much for the sake of making them known as for stirring the heart. For beneath the prevalence of carnal delights the knowledge of natural righteousness sleeps forgotten. When then a teacher begins to denounce carnal sins, his teaching does not bring up a new knowledge, but recalls to memory one that had been forgotten. But He preached the Gospel, in telling of good things which the ancients had manifestly not heard of, as the happiness of heaven, the resurrection of the dead, and the like. Or, He taught by interpreting the prophecies concerning Himself; He preached by declaring the benefits that were to come from Himself.

Saint Remigius: That the teacher should study to commend his teaching by his own virtuous conduct is conveyed in those words, healing every sort of disease and malady among the people; maladies of the body, diseases of the soul.

Pseudo-Chrysostom: Or, by disease we may understand any passion of the mind, as avarice, lust, and such like, by malady unbelief, that is, weakness of faith. Or, the diseases are the more grievous pains of the body, the maladies the slighter. As He cured the bodily pains by virtue of His divine power, so He cured the spiritual by the word of His mercy. He first teaches, and then performs the cures, for two reasons. First, that what is needed most may come first; for it is the word of holy instruction, and not miracles, that edify the soul. Secondly, because teaching is commended by miracles, not the converse.

Chrysostom: We must consider that when some great change is being wrought, as the introduction of a new polity, God is wont to work miracles, giving pledges of His power to those who are to receive His laws. Thus when He would make man, He first created a world, and then at length gave man in paradise a law. When He would dispense a law to the holy Noah, he shewed truly great wonders; and again when He was about to ordain the Law for the Jews, He first showed great prodigies, and then at length gave them the commandments. So now when about to introduce a sublime discipline of life, He first provided a sanction to His instructions by mighty signs, because the eternal kingdom He preached was not seen, by the things which did appear, He made sure that which as yet did not appear.

Preceded by Matthew 4:22	Gospel of Matthew; Chapter 4	Succeeded by Matthew 4:24
