= Matthew 4:8 =

- ← 4:7 4:9 →
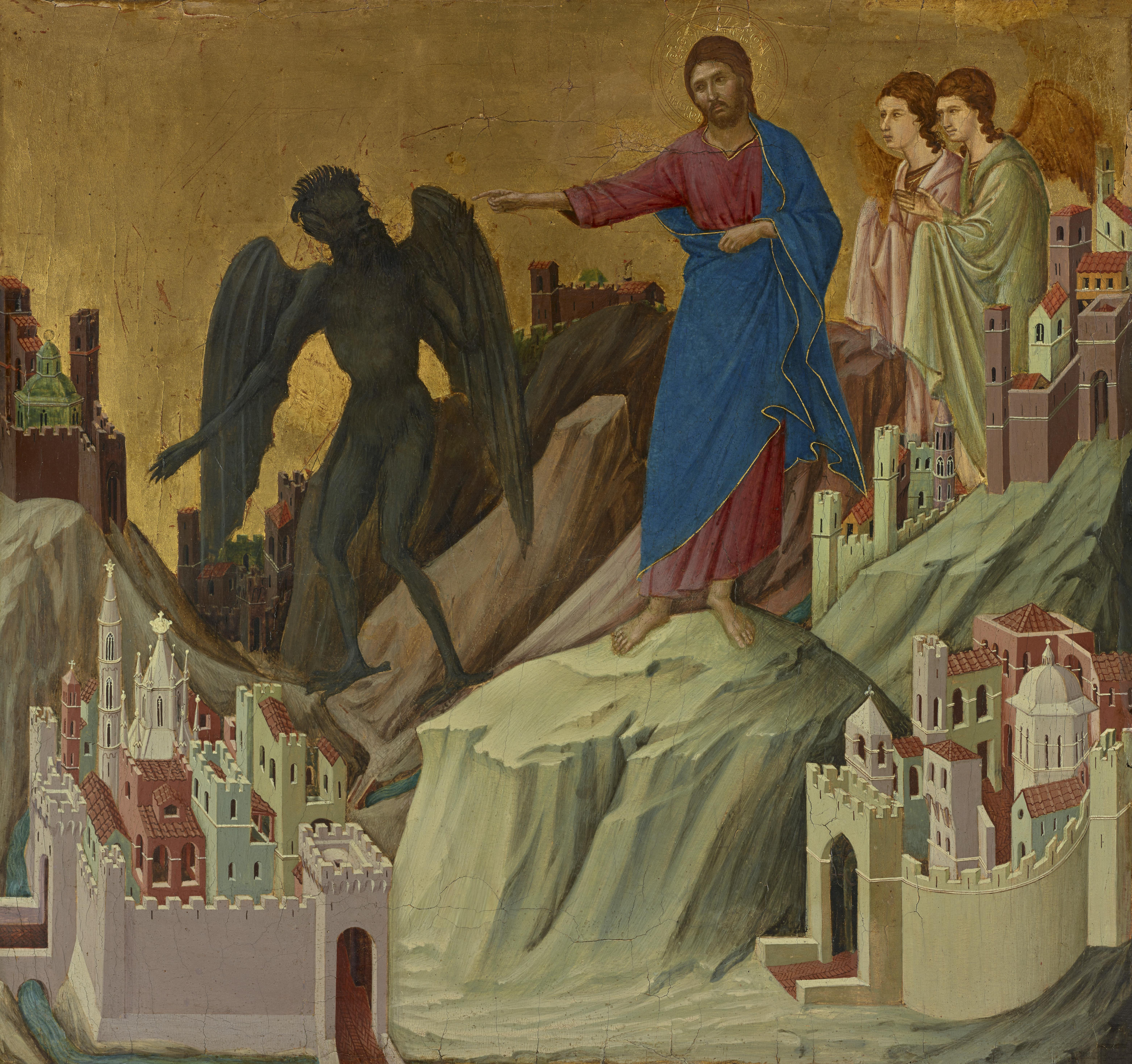
- Duccio's The Temptation on the Mount
- Book: Gospel of Matthew
- Christian Bible part: New Testament

Matthew 4:8 is the eighth verse of the fourth chapter of the Gospel of Matthew in the New Testament. Jesus has just rejected Satan's second temptation. In this verse the devil transports Jesus to a new location for the third temptation.

== Content ==
The original Koine Greek, according to Westcott and Hort, reads:

παλιν παραλαμβανει αυτον ο διαβολος εις ορος υψηλον λιαν και δεικνυσιν
αυτω πασας τας βασιλειας του κοσμου και την δοξαν αυτων

In the King James Version of the Bible, the text reads:

Again, the devil taketh him up into an
exceeding high mountain, and sheweth him all the
kingdoms of the world, and the glory of them;

The World English Bible translates the passage as:

Again, the devil took him to an exceedingly
high mountain, and showed him all the
kingdoms of the world, and their glory.

For a collection of other versions see BibleHub Matthew 4:8

== Analysis ==
The Gospel of Luke does not mention a mountain. Luke 4:5 simply refers to a "high place." There is a mountain near Jericho that is popularly claimed to be the site of this temptation, but France notes there is no scriptural or historical evidence to support this. There is possibly a link between this verse and Moses viewing the Holy Land in Deuteronomy 3:27 and Deuteronomy 34:1–4, but Nolland does not think such a link is sensical.

There is, of course, no mountain from where "all the kingdoms of the world" can be seen. One explanation for this is that the word taketh does not necessarily refer to a physical transportation, it could mean that Satan merely took Jesus in a vision. John Calvin supported this view, and the Geneva Bible made this interpretation explicit. Clarke lists several other explanation that have been given for this statement:

- The world only refers to the "known world" of that time and people, or is a general expression referring to the local region, which could be seen from a mountain.
- The word kingdom does not refer to geographical entities, but is rather a metaphor for earthly power.
- The showing did not itself take place on the mountain, rather the actual "showing" consisted of a rapid fly over of the entire world.
- Once atop the mountain the devil did not literally show Jesus the kingdoms but rather pulled out a map upon which all the kingdoms were displayed.
- Fortna also notes that the verse could be implying a Flat Earth, which would allow for all countries to be seen at once from a tall enough mountain.

Clark notes that the mountain setting evokes pagan mythology, which often had to gods atop mountains of extreme height. The most famous example being Mount Olympus of the Greeks. The deuterocanonical Book of Baruch also mentions a mountain from where all the kingdoms of the Earth can be seen.

Nolland contrasts the"kingdoms of the world" to the "Kingdom of Heaven" that is mentioned throughout the Gospel, one being the kingdom of Satan and the other the kingdom of God.

This verse is often considered to be a reference to Deuteronomy 32:49, where God instructs Moses to climb Mount Nebo and shows him Jericho and Canaan and promises them to the Israelites. This verse shows that Jesus' domain is greater, as he is presented with the entire world. France notes that it also implies that the devil then had control of the entire globe prior to the coming of Jesus, something made explicit in Luke 4:6 and John 12:31.

== Commentary from the Church Fathers ==
Pseudo-Chrysostom: "The Devil, left in uncertainty by this second reply, passes to a third temptation. Christ had broken the nets of appetite, had passed over those of ambition, he now spreads for Him those of covetousness; He taketh him up into a very high mountain, such as in going round about the earth he had noticed rising above the rest. The higher the mountain, the wider the view from it. He shows Him not so as that they truly saw the very kingdoms, cities, nations, their silver and their gold; but the quarters of the earth where each kingdom and city lay. As suppose from some high ground I were to point out to you, see there lies Rome, there Alexandria; you are not supposed to see the towns themselves, but the quarter in which they lie. Thus the Devil might point out the several quarters with his finger, and recount in words the greatness of each kingdom and its condition; for that is said to be shown which is in any way presented to the understanding.

Origen: "We are not to suppose that when he showed Him the kingdoms of the world, he presented before Him the kingdom of Persia, for instance, or India; but he showed his own kingdom, how he reigns in the world, that is, how some are governed by fornication, some by avarice."

Saint Remigius: "By their glory, is meant, their gold and silver, precious stones and temporal goods."

Rabanus Maurus: "The Devil shows all this to the Lord, not as though he had power to extend his vision or show Him anything unknown. But setting forth in speech as excellent and pleasant, that vain worldly pomp wherein himself delighted, he thought by suggestion of it, to create in Christ a love of it."

Glossa Ordinaria: "He saw not, as we see, with the eye of lust, but as a physician looks on disease without receiving any hurt."

Preceded by Matthew 4:7	Gospel of Matthew; Chapter 4	Succeeded by Matthew 4:9
