= Matthew 4:18 =

- ← 4:17 4:19 →
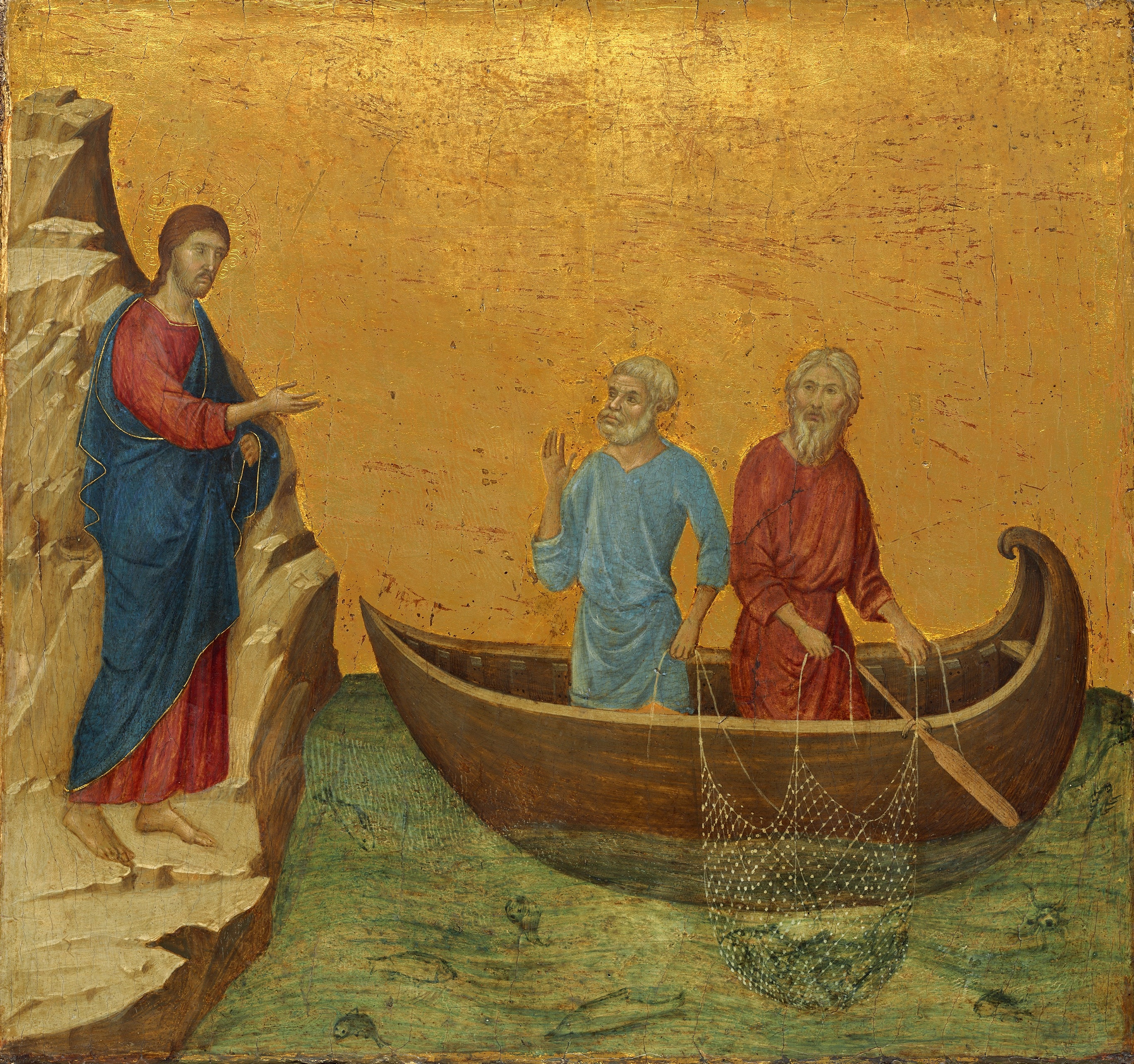
- Duccio's Calling of the Apostles Peter and Andrew
- Book: Gospel of Matthew
- Christian Bible part: New Testament

Matthew 4:18 is the eighteenth verse of the fourth chapter of the Gospel of Matthew in the New Testament. Jesus has just begun preaching in Galilee. In this verse he encounters the first of his disciples.

== Content ==
The original Koine Greek, according to Westcott and Hort, reads:

περιπατων δε παρα την θαλασσαν της γαλιλαιας ειδεν δυο αδελφους σιμωνα τον λεγομενον πετρον
και ανδρεαν τον αδελφον αυτου βαλλοντας αμφιβληστρον εις την θαλασσαν ησαν γαρ αλιεις

In the King James Version of the Bible the text reads:

And Jesus, walking by the sea of Galilee, saw two brethren, Simon called Peter, and
Andrew his brother, casting a net into the sea: for they were fishers.

The World English Bible translates the passage as:

Walking by the sea of Galilee, he saw two brothers: Simon, who is called Peter,
and Andrew, his brother, casting a net into the sea; for they were fishermen.

For a collection of other versions see BibleHub Matthew 4:18

== Analysis ==
This verse is based on Mark 1:16, with only a few changes. Matthew adds "two brothers", perhaps to make the relationship more explicit, or in Nolland's view to make the calling in this verse more closely parallel the calling of James and John.

Matthew 4:13 has Jesus living in the town of Capernaum, by the Sea of Galilee. However, the other Gospels and the rest of Matthew imply that Jesus was an itinerant preacher at this point, something France feels is also implied in this verse by the reference to Jesus walking.

This verse introduces two of Jesus' most important followers the brothers Simon and Andrew, both of these figures play an important role in the Gospels and are given prominent roles by almost all Christian churches. Schweizer notes that, unlike Mark, Matthew immediately mentions that Peter is an alternate name for Simon. Schweizer feels this is because Matthew's audience would have been well aware of the stories of the disciple and knew him by the name Peter. This has the effect of changing the meaning of Matthew 16:18 from Jesus bestowing a nickname upon Simon to merely using a nickname that had long been attached to him. Throughout the book Matthew uses the name Peter, only using the name Simon on rare occasions.

The name Simon is the Greek form of the Hebrew name Shimeon, a common Jewish name that Albright and Mann note is found in the Old Testament and in Josephus. Both Andrew and Peter are names of Greek origins which France sees as an accurate reflection of the multicultural nature of the Galilee at this time. Albright and Mann note that evidence for Andrew being used as a name for a Jew dates back to 169 BC.

France notes that the Sea of Galilee at the time was known for its prosperous fishing industry. This was mainly based around fishing for sardines, carp, and musht (Note: "Musht" means "comb". Musht fish are large fish, up to 16 inches long and weigh 2 pounds. McNamer 2006.) fish. Various methods were used, but nets were common. Dragnets were common, but they required a large team to use. This verse is thus more likely referring to some form of gill net. Fishing was a common occupation of the region and that the disciples seem to own their own equipment is evidence that they were relatively prosperous.

== Commentary from the Church Fathers ==
Pseudo-Chrysostom: Before He spoke or did anything, Christ called Apostles, that neither word nor deed of His should be hid from their knowledge, so that they may afterwards say with confidence, What we have seen and heard, that we cannot but speak. (Acts 4:20.)

Rabanus Maurus: The sea of Galilee, the lake of Gennesareth, the sea of Tiberias, and the salt lake, are one and the same.

Glossa Ordinaria: He rightly goes to fishing places, when about to fish for fishermen.

Saint Remigius: Saw, that is, not so much with the bodily eye, as spiritually viewing their hearts.

Chrysostom: He calls them while actually working at their employment, to show that to follow Him ought to be preferred to all occupations. They were just then casting a net into the sea, which agreed with their future office.

Augustine: He chose not kings, senators, philosophers, or orators, but he chose common, poor, and untaught fishermen.

Augustine: Had one learned been chosen, he might have attributed the choice to the merit of his learning. But our Lord Jesus Christ, willing to bow the necks of the proud, sought not to gain fishermen by orators, but gained an Emperor by a fisherman. Great was Cyprian the pleader, but Peter the fisherman was before him.

Pseudo-Chrysostom: The operations of their secular craft were a prophecy of their future dignity. As he who casts his net into the water knows not what fishes he shall take, so the teacher casts the net of the divine word upon the people, not knowing who among them will come to God. Those whom God shall stir abide in his doctrine.

Saint Remigius: Of these fishermen the Lord speaks by Jeremiah. I will send my fishers among you, and they shall catch you. (Jer. 16:16.)

== Sources ==
- Nolland, John (2005). The Gospel of Matthew: a commentary on the Greek text. Wm. B. Eerdmans Publishing.

Preceded by Matthew 4:17	Gospel of Matthew; Chapter 4	Succeeded by Matthew 4:19
