= Fishers of men =

Phrase from the gospels

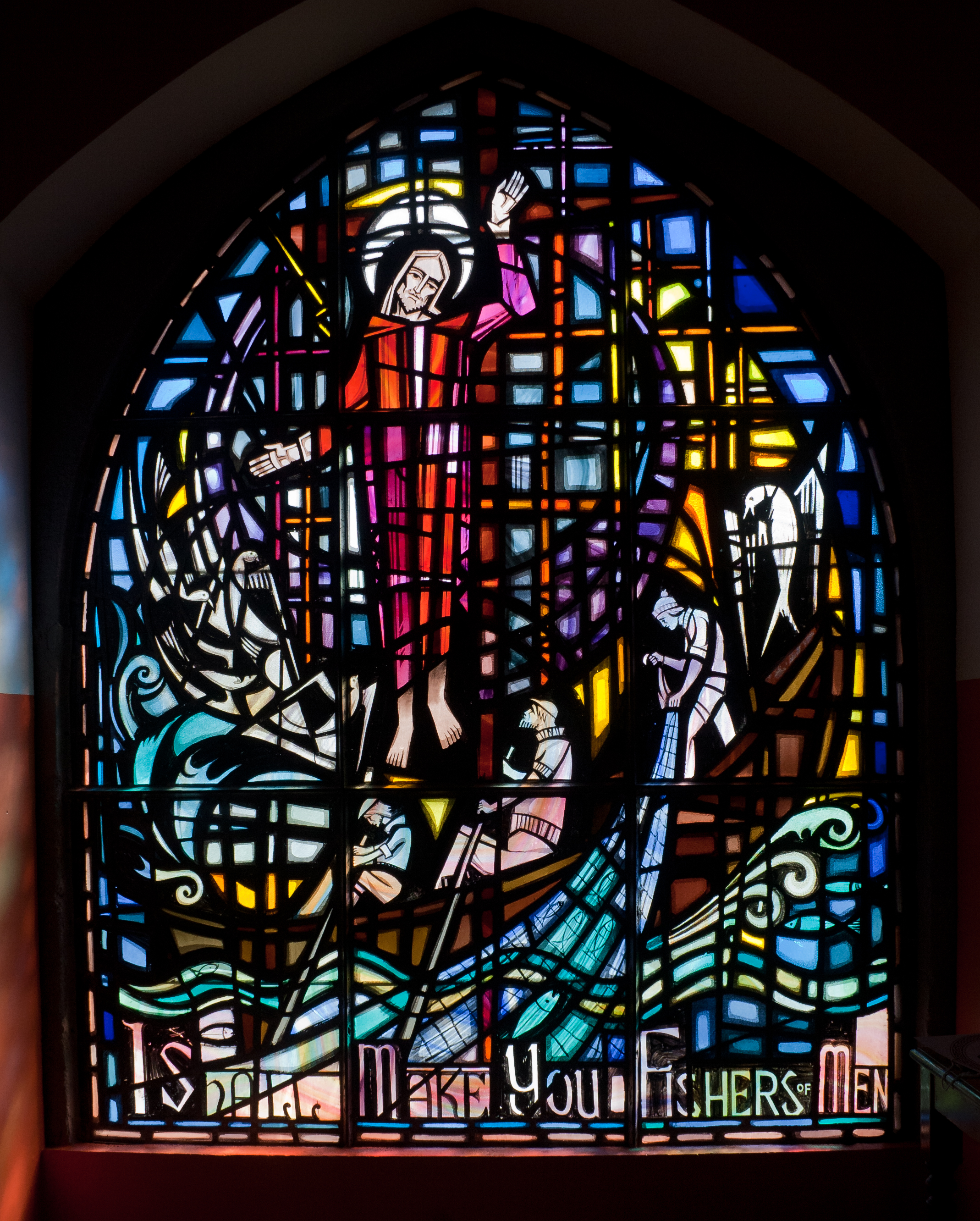
"I Shall Make You Fishers of Men"; a stained glass window at Kilmore Quay, Ireland

"Fishers of men" (Greek: ἁλιεῖς ἀνθρώπων, 'fishermen of men', from ὁ ἁλιεύς, 'seaman, fisherman', and ὁ/ἡ ἄνθρωπος, 'man, human being, woman') is a phrase used in the gospels to describe the mandate given by Jesus to his first disciples. Two brother fishermen, Simon called Peter and Andrew, were casting a net into the Sea of Galilee. As he commenced his preaching ministry, Jesus called them to follow him and told them that in doing so they were to become "fishers of men". The phrase is mentioned in Matthew 4:19 and Mark 1:17. Matthew's version states:

He said to them, "Follow me,
and I will make you fishers of men."

— Matthew 4:19 ESV

This calling of the first Apostles, which eventually become a group of twelve, made the two fishermen early followers of Jesus. There is a parallel account in Mark 1:16–20 and a similar but different story in Luke 5:1–11; the Luke story does not include the phrase "fishers of men," but features the comparable sentence "Do not be afraid; from now on you will be catching men." The Cambridge Bible for Schools and Colleges calls Matthew 4:19 a "condensed parable", drawn out at slightly greater length later in the same gospel.

== Hymns ==
The Christian hymn "Fishers of Men" was written by Harry D. Clarke in 1927.

== Parallels ==
Chapters 36–39 of the Mandaean Book of John are about a fisher sent by Hayyi Rabbi ("the Great Life") to fish for souls.

== Commentary ==
John McEvilly writes that Jesus' meaning of "fishers of men" is those "destined to bring men into the Church and to life eternal". The allusion is, of course, to their former work. Jesus appears to be "fond of borrowing examples from the ordinary occupations of those He addresses". McEvilly further notes that Luke "pointedly records" that it was into Peter's boat, Jesus went to teach, and that to Peter he said these words, who was later to become the foremost among the apostles (see Matt. 16:18, 19, John 21:15, Acts 2-3).

== See also ==
- Calling of the disciples
- Chronology of Jesus
- Gospel harmony
- Commissioning the twelve Apostles
- Life of Jesus in the New Testament
