= Matthew 3:11 =

- ← 3:10 3:12 →
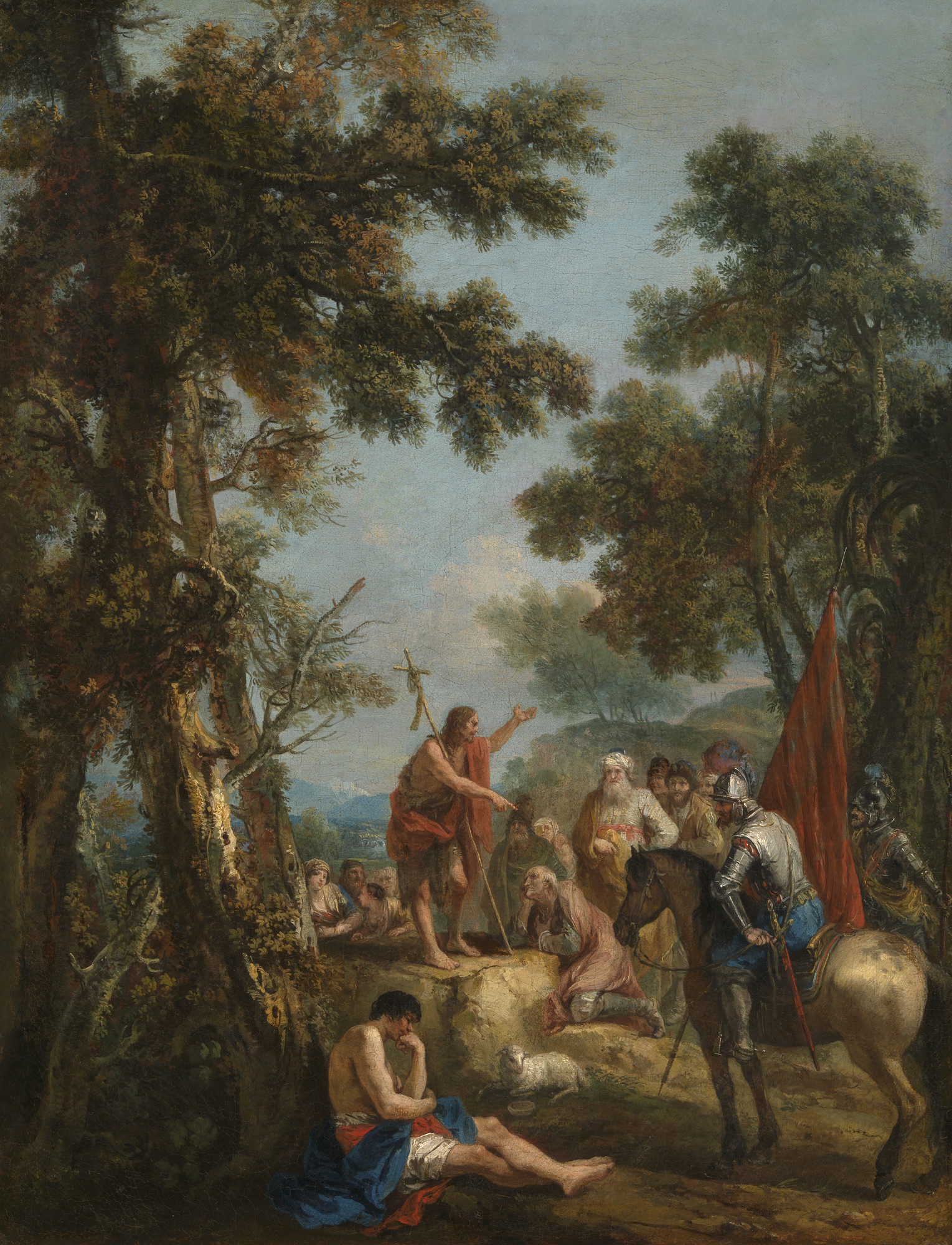
- Francesco Zuccarelli's Saint John the Baptist Preaching (circa 1735–1745).
- Book: Gospel of Matthew
- Christian Bible part: New Testament

Matthew 3:11 is the eleventh verse of the third chapter of the Gospel of Matthew in the New Testament. The verse occurs in the section relating the preachings of John the Baptist. In this verse he predicts that he will be followed by someone much greater than himself. The main theme of this verse is that John will soon be supplanted by a much greater figure and that John's water baptism is just a preparation for the much greater baptism with the Holy Spirit and fire.

== Content ==
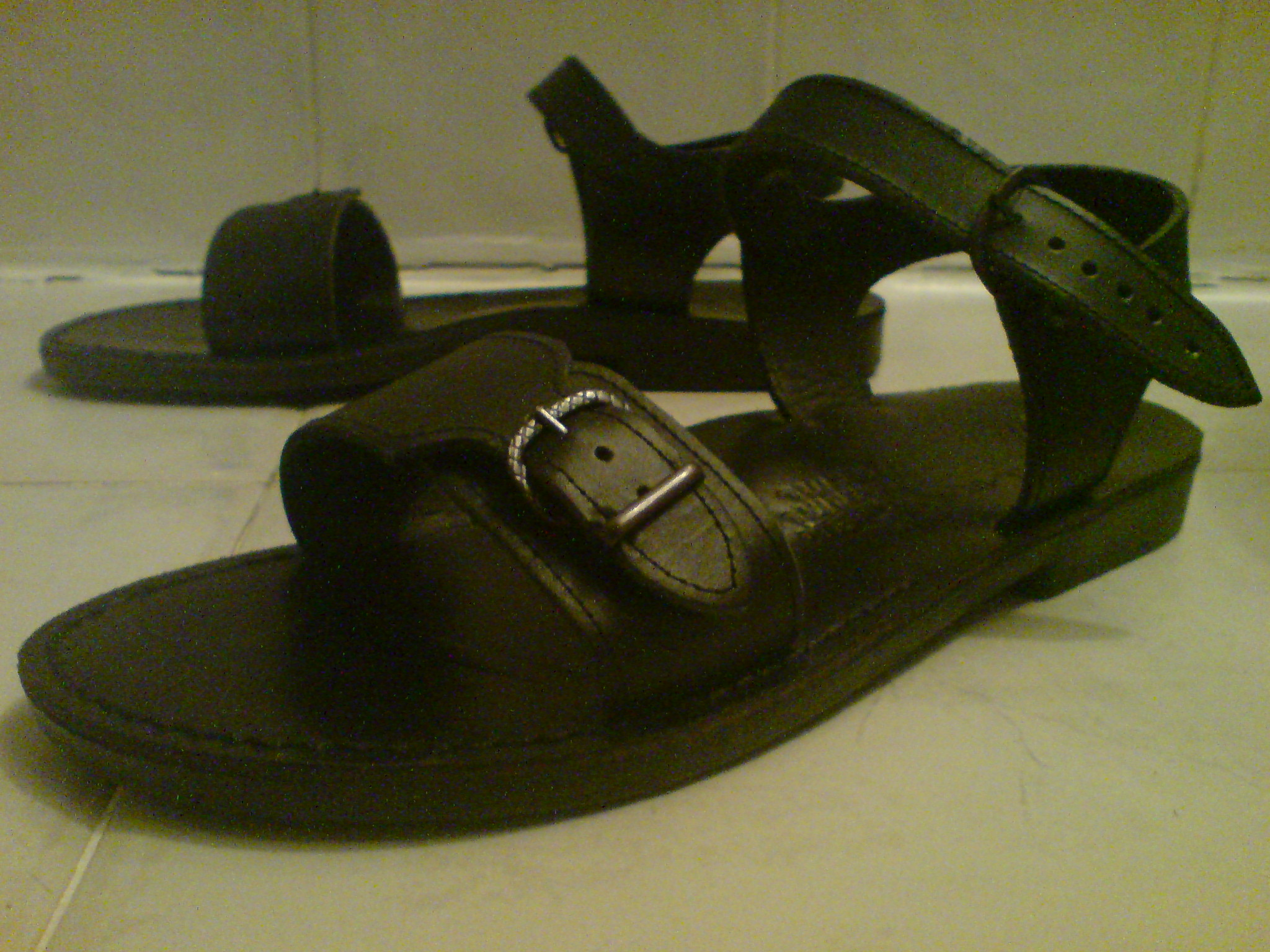
Sandals ("shoes" in KJV) with modern straps, but of a similar style as the sandals in Roman times.

In the King James Version of the Bible the text reads:

I indeed baptize you with water unto
repentance. but he that cometh after
me is mightier than I, whose shoes I
am not worthy to bear: he shall baptize
you with the Holy Ghost, and with fire:

The New International Version translates the passage as:

"I baptize you with water for repentance.
But after me will come one who is more
powerful than I, whose sandals I am not
fit to carry. He will baptize you
with the Holy Spirit and with fire.

The 1881 Westcott-Hort Greek text is:

εγω μεν υμας βαπτιζω εν υδατι εις μετανοιαν
ο δε οπισω μου ερχομενος ισχυροτερος μου εστιν
ου ουκ ειμι ικανος τα υποδηματα βαστασαι αυτος υμας
βαπτισει εν πνευματι αγιω και πυρι

For a collection of other versions see BibleHub Matthew 3:11

== Analysis ==
This verse corresponds with the Gospel of Mark for the first time since Matthew 3:6, being mirrored by Mark 1:7 and 8. This verse is also found in Luke at Luke 3:16; however the context there is somewhat different. In Luke, John is addressing a receptive multitude; in Matthew it is assumed he is still speaking to the Pharisees and Sadducees introduced in Matthew 3:7. Schweizer notes that despite this, the verse is still written as though it is addressing all Israel. Matthew has also entirely skipped the content found in Luke 3:10–14. This is understandable as the response from the crowd is not in keeping with the hostile and unrepentant Pharisees and Sadducees.

France notes that the word translated as after is not chronological, rather it means the one who is a follower or disciple. This links in with the reference to shoes. At the time the disciple of a Rabbi would be expected to perform menial chores. However shoes, a word perhaps better translated as sandals, were considered unclean, a tradition that persists in the Middle East today. Thus the disciple would not deal with them, and such a task would be left to the lowest slave. Thus John the Baptist is presenting himself as very lowly indeed. Matthew slightly differs from the wording found in Luke and Mark. In those two gospels, John is not worthy of untying the messiah's sandals, in Matthew he is unworthy of carrying them.

John predicts a much stronger form of baptism by the Holy Spirit and by fire. It is from this verse that the expression "baptism by fire" comes. Hill notes for many years scholars felt that linking the Holy Spirit with fire, a symbol of God's wrath, clashed with the portrayal of the Spirit elsewhere in the New Testament, which saw it as a purely loving and helpful force incompatible with a destructive judgement. A number of theories were proposed to address this, some translations dropped the word fire to create a less destructive image. Another option is that Holy Spirit should actually read wind, as the same word can be used for wind and spirit in Greek. This would also link it to the next verse. This all changed with the discovery of the Dead Sea Scrolls found at Qumran, near where John the Baptist was said to be preaching. In a number of the texts, the Holy Spirit is linked to God's wrath and judgement leading most scholars to include that the wording here is original and that there were different views of the Holy Spirit circulating in the first century. Nolland notes that many scholars have attempted to use this verse as evidence for the Christian baptism ritual, but he does not believe that Jesus' baptism by fire and holy spirit can be so linked.

Whether the more powerful one coming after is a reference to God or Jesus is a matter of debate. After this verse, Jesus immediately enters the narrative, and the corporeal metaphor of carrying his shoes would seem to describe a human figure. On the other hand, this violent imagery contradicts the idea of the Messiah as a bringer of peace. Schnackenburg argues the wording in this passage is deliberately obscure between the two options.

Jerome comments on the Holy Spirit and fire aspect of this passage saying, "Either the Holy Ghost Himself is a fire, as we learn from the Acts, when there sat as it were fire on the tongues of the believers; and thus the word of the Lord was fulfilled who said, I am come to send fire on the earth, I will that it burn. (Luke 12:49.) Or, we are baptized now with the Spirit, hereafter with fire; as the Apostle speaks, Fire shall try every man’s work, of what sort it is. (1 Cor. 3:13.)"

Rabanus Maurus says, "As though he had said, I indeed am mighty to invite to repentance, He to forgive sins; I to preach the kingdom of heaven, He to bestow it; I to baptize with water, He with the Spirit."

== Textual witnesses ==
Some early manuscripts containing the text of this verse are:

- Papyrus 101 (3rd century)
- Codex Vaticanus (~325–350)
- Codex Sinaiticus (~330–360)
- Codex Washingtonianus (~400)
- Codex Bezae (~400)
- Codex Ephraemi Rescriptus (~450)

== Commentary from the Church Fathers ==
Glossa Ordinaria: As in the preceding words John had explained more at length what he had shortly preached in the words, Repent ye, so now follows a more full enlargement of the words, The kingdom of heaven is at hand.

Gregory the Great: John baptizes not with the Spirit but with water, because he had no power to forgive sins; he washes the body with water, but not at the same time the soul with pardon of sin.

Chrysostom: For while as yet the sacrifice had not been offered, nor remission of sin sent, nor the Spirit had descended on the water, how could sin be forgiven? But since the Jews never perceived their own sin, and this was the cause of all their evils, John came to bring them to a sense of them by calling them to repentance.

Gregory the Great: Why then does he baptize who could not remit sin, but that he may preserve in all things the office of forerunner? As his birth had preceded Christ's birth, so his baptism should precede the Lord's baptism.

Pseudo-Chrysostom: Or, John was sent to baptize, that to such as came to his baptism he might announce the presence among them of the Lord in the flesh, as himself testifies in another place, That He might be manifested to Israel, therefore am I come to baptise with water. (John 1:31.)

Augustine: Or, he baptizes, because it behoved Christ to be baptized. But if indeed John was sent only to baptize Christ, why was not He alone baptized by John? Because had the Lord alone been baptized by John, there would not have lacked who should insist that John's baptism was greater than Christ's, inasmuch as Christ alone had the merit to be baptized by it.

Rabanus Maurus: Or, by this sign of baptism he separates the penitent from the impenitent, and directs them to the baptism of Christ.

Pseudo-Chrysostom: Because then he baptized on account of Christ, therefore to them who came to him for baptism he preached that Christ should come, signifying the eminence of His power in the words, He who cometh after me is mightier than I.

Saint Remigius: There are five points in which Christ comes after John, His birth, preaching, baptism, death, and descent into hell. A beautiful expression is that, mightier than I, because he is mere man, the other is God and man.

Rabanus Maurus: As though he had said, I indeed am mighty to invite to repentance, He to forgive sins; I to preach the kingdom of heaven, He to bestow it; I to baptize with water, He with the Spirit.

Chrysostom: When you hear for He is mightier than I, do not suppose this to be said by way of comparison, for I am not worthy to be numbered among his servants, that I might undertake the lowest office.

Hilary of Poitiers: Leaving to the Apostles the glory of bearing about the Gospel, to whose beautiful feet was due the carrying the tidings of God's peace.

Pseudo-Chrysostom: Or, by the feet of Christ we may understand Christians, especially the Apostles, and other preachers, among whom was John Baptist; and the shoes are the infirmities with which he loads the preachers. These shoes all Christ's preachers wear; and John also wore them; but declares himself unworthy, that he might show the grace of Christ, and be greater than his deserts.

Jerome: In the other Gospels it is, whose shoe latchet I am not worthy to loose. Here his humility, there his ministry is intended; Christ is the Bridegroom, and John is not worthy to loose the Bridegroom's shoe, that his house be not called according to the Law of Moses and the example of Ruth, The house of him that hath his shoe loosed. (Deut. 25:10.)

Jerome: Either the Holy Ghost Himself is a fire, as we learn from the Acts, when there sat as it were fire on the tongues of the believers; and thus the word of the Lord was fulfilled who said, I am come to send fire on the earth, I will that it burn. (Luke 12:49.) Or, we are baptized now with the Spirit, hereafter with fire; as the Apostle speaks, Fire shall try every man's work, of what sort it ise. (1 Cor. 3:13.)

Chrysostom: He does not say, shall give you the Holy Ghost, but shall baptize you in the Holy Ghost, showing in metaphor the abundance of the grace. fThis further shows, that even under the faith there is need of the will alone for justification, not of labours and toilings; and even as easy a thing as it is to be baptized, even so easy a thing it is to be changed and made better. By fire he signifies the strength of grace which cannot be overcome, and that it may be understood that He makes His own people at once like to the great and old prophets, most of the prophetic visions were by fire.

Hilary of Poitiers: He marks the time of our salvation and judgment in the Lord; those who are baptized in the Holy Ghost it remains that they be consummated by the fire of judgment.

== See also ==
- Malachi 4:1

Preceded by Matthew 3:10	Gospel of Matthew; Chapter 3	Succeeded by Matthew 3:12
