= Matthew 3:10 =

- ← 3:9 3:11 →
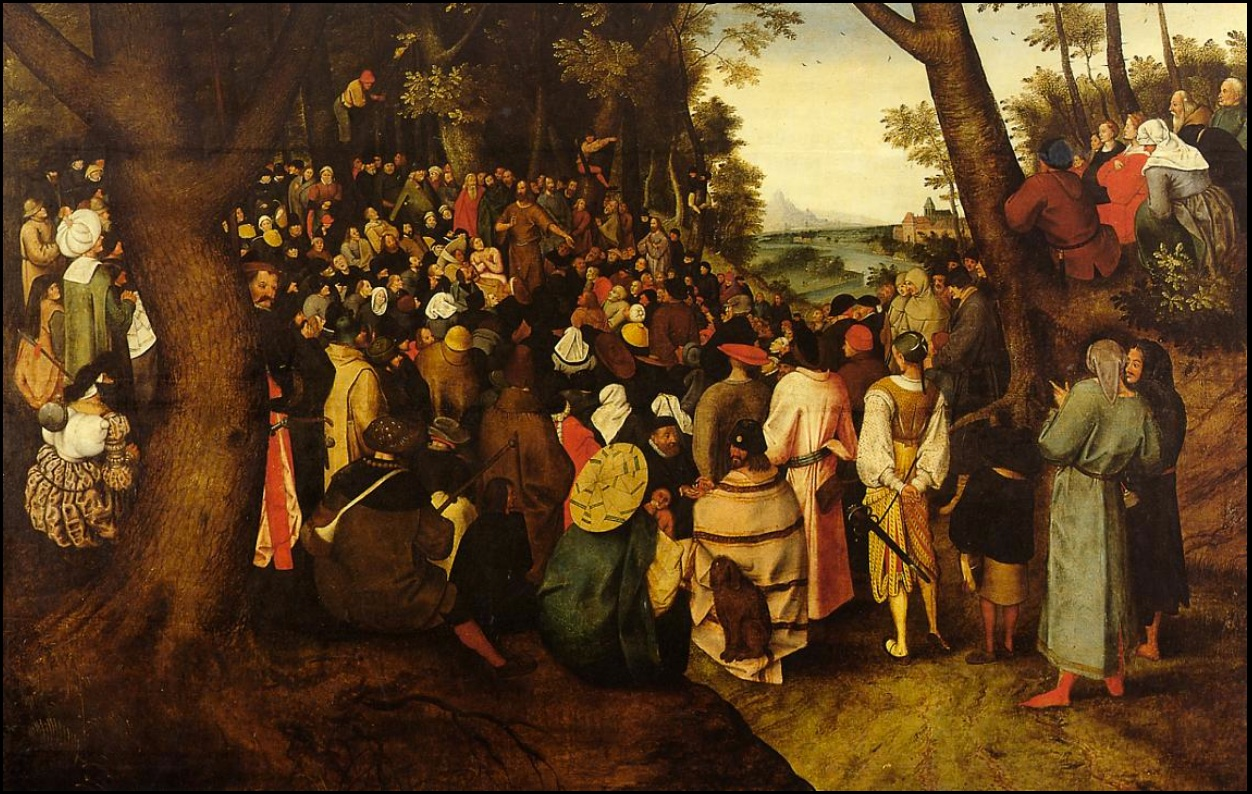
- Pieter Brueghel the Younger's St John the Baptist Preaching (1601).
- Book: Gospel of Matthew
- Christian Bible part: New Testament

Matthew 3:10 is the tenth verse of the third chapter of the Gospel of Matthew in the New Testament. The verse occurs in where John the Baptist is berating the Pharisees and Sadducees. He has previously called them a brood of vipers and warned them of the wrath to come and has urged them to repent. This verse returns to the fruit metaphor of Matthew 3:8 adding a promise of eventual punishment.

== Content ==
In the King James Version of the Bible the text reads:

And now also the axe is laid
unto the root of the trees:
therefore every tree which
bringeth not forth good fruit is
hewn down, and cast into the fire.

The World English Bible translates the passage as:

"Even now the axe lies at the
root of the trees. Therefore,
every tree that doesn't bring
forth good fruit is cut down,
and cast into the fire.

The 1881 Westcott-Hort Greek text is:

ἤδη δὲ ἡ ἀξίνη πρὸς τὴν ῥίζαν τῶν δένδρων κεῖται
πᾶν οῡ̓ν δένδρον μὴ ποιοῦν καρπὸν καλὸν ἐκκόπτεται
καὶ εἰς πῦρ βάλλεται

For a collection of other versions see BibleHub Matthew 3:10.

== Analysis ==
In Matthew 3:8 John tells the Pharisees and Sadducees that they must manifest the fruit of repentance if they are to avoid the wrath of God. This verse threatens that every tree that does not bear fruit will be destroyed, i.e. that people who do not repent will face divine punishment. As in Matthew 3:2 this punishment is said to be in the very near future.

The imagery is of God as a lumberjack cutting down trees and then burning them. Specifically it refers to an axe being placed at the base of a tree just above the roots, which would be the final action before beginning to chop down the tree.

Similar imagery is used in Isaiah 10:34 and in Jeremiah 46:22, which France, R.T. feels may be the inspiration for this verse. He also notes that in Aramaic the word for root is ikkar while the word for cut down is kar thus this verse may be another example of wordplay.

This verse is almost identical to Luke 3:9, but is not found anywhere in Mark. Thus supporters of the two-source hypothesis feel that it was likely part of Q, as with the preceding verses.

== Commentary from the Church Fathers ==
Pseudo-Chrysostom: The axe is that most sharp fury of the consummation of all things, that is to hew down the whole world. But if it be already laid, how hath it not yet cut down? Because these trees have reason and free power to do good, or leave undone; so that when they see the axe laid to their root, they may fear and bring forth fruit. This denunciation of wrath then, which is meant by the laying of the axe to the root, though it have no effect on the bad, yet will sever the good from the bad.

Jerome: Or, the preaching of the Gospel is meant, as the Prophet Jeremiah also compares the Word of the Lord to an axe cleaving the rock. (Jer. 23:29.)

Gregory the Great: Or, the axe signifies the Redeemer, who as an axe of haft and blade, so consisting of the Divine and human nature, is held by His human, but cuts by His Divine nature. And though this axe be laid at the root of the tree waiting in patience, it is yet seen what it will do; for each obstinate sinner who here neglects the fruit of good works, finds the fire of hell ready for him. Observe, the axe is laid to the root, not to the branches; for that when the children of wickedness are removed, the branches only of the unfruitful tree are cut away. But when the whole offspring with their parent is carried off, the unfruitful tree is cut down by the root, that there remain not whence the evil shoots should spring up again.

Chrysostom: By saying Every, he cuts off all privilege of nobility: as much as to say, Though thou be the son of Abraham, if thou abide fruitless thou shalt suffer the punishment.

Rabanus Maurus: There are four sorts of trees; the first totally withered, to which the Pagans may be likened; the second, green but unfruitful, as the hypocrites; the third, green and fruitful, but poisonous, such are heretics; the fourth, green and bringing forth good fruit, to which are like the good Catholics.

Gregory the Great: Therefore every tree that bringeth not forth good fruit shall be cut down, and cast into the fire, because he who here neglects to bring forth the fruit of good works finds a fire in hell prepared for him.

== Textual witnesses ==
Some early manuscripts containing the text of this verse are:

- Papyrus 101 (3rd century)
- Codex Vaticanus (~325–350)
- Codex Sinaiticus (~330–360)
- Codex Washingtonianus (~400)
- Codex Bezae (~400)
- Codex Ephraemi Rescriptus (~450)

Preceded by Matthew 3:9	Gospel of Matthew; Chapter 3	Succeeded by Matthew 3:11
