= Matthew 3:5 =

- ← 3:4 3:6 →
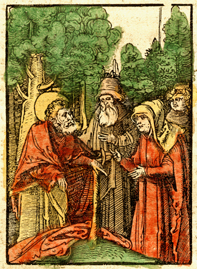
- A woodcut from the 1516 Das Plenarium oder Ewangely buoch showing John the Baptist preaching
- Book: Gospel of Matthew
- Christian Bible part: New Testament

Matthew 3:5 is the fifth verse of the third chapter of the Gospel of Matthew in the New Testament. The verse occurs in the section introducing John the Baptist with this verse describing his popularity in the region.

== Content ==
In the King James Version of the Bible the text reads:

Then went out to him Jerusalem, and
all Judaea, and all the region
round about Jordan.

The World English Bible translates the passage as:

Then people from Jerusalem,
all of Judea, and all the region
around the Jordan went out to him.

The 1881 Westcott-Hort Greek text is:

τοτε εξεπορευετο προς αυτον ιεροσολυμα
και πασα η ιουδαια
και πασα η περιχωρος του ιορδανου

For a collection of other versions see BibleHub Matthew 3:5.

== Analysis ==
This verse describes Jews coming from Jerusalem all of Judea and the areas around the Jordan River to hear John the Baptist preach. It is a slight rewording of Mark 1:5. While Matthew 3:1 placed John in the wilderness, he was only about 20 miles from Jerusalem and it would have been very possible for pilgrims to make the journey. This description is considered historically credible as it is backed up by Josephus (37–100). An account of John the Baptist is found in all extant manuscripts of his Antiquities of the Jews (book 18, chapter 5, 2) where he says of John the Baptist that the "others came in crowds about him, for they were very greatly moved by hearing his words". In fact at the time Josephus was writing, around 97 AD, John the Baptist seems to still be a far better-known figure than Jesus, to whom Josephus only makes two much disputed references.

== Commentary from the Church Fathers ==
Pseudo-Chrysostom: Having described the preaching of John, he goes on to say, There went out to him, for his severe life preached yet more loudly in the desert than the voice of his crying.

Chrysostom: For it was wonderful to see such fortitude in a human body; this it was that chiefly attracted the Jews, seeing in him the great Elias. It also contributed to fill them with wonder that the grace of Prophecy had long failed among them, and now seemed to have at length revived. Also the manner of his preaching being other than that of the old prophets had much effect; for now they heard not such things as they were wont to hear, such as wars, and conquests of the king of Babylon, or of Persia; but of Heaven and the Kingdom there, and the punishment of hell.

== Sources ==
- Albright, W.F. and C.S. Mann. "Matthew." The Anchor Bible Series. New York: Doubleday & Company, 1971.
- Feldman, Louis H.; Hata, Gōhei, eds. (1987). Josephus, Judaism and Christianity. BRILL. ISBN 978-90-04-08554-1.
- Flavius Josephus; Maier, Paul L. (December 1995). Josephus, the essential works: a condensation of Jewish antiquities and The Jewish war. Kregel Academic. ISBN 978-0-8254-3260-6.

| Preceded by Matthew 3:4 | Gospel of Matthew; Chapter 3 | Succeeded by Matthew 3:6 |
