= Matthew 3:7 =

- ← 3:6 3:8 →
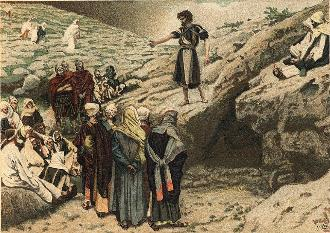
- James Tissot's John and the Pharisees
- Book: Gospel of Matthew
- Christian Bible part: New Testament

Matthew 3:7 is the seventh verse of the third chapter of the Gospel of Matthew in the New Testament. The verse occurs in the section introducing John the Baptist. In this verse John attacks the Pharisees and Sadducees.

== Text ==
In the King James Version of the Bible the text reads:

But when he saw many of the
Pharisees and Sadducees come
to his baptism, he said unto
them, O generation of vipers,
who hath warned you to flee
from the wrath to come?

The World English Bible translates the passage as:

But when he saw many of the
Pharisees and Sadducees coming
for his baptism, he said to them,
"You offspring of vipers, who warned
you to flee from the wrath to come?

The 1881 Westcott-Hort Greek text is:

ιδων δε πολλους των φαρισαιων και σαδδουκαιων ερχομενους επι το βαπτισμα
ειπεν αυτοις
γεννηματα εχιδνων
τις υπεδειξεν υμιν φυγειν απο της μελλουσης οργης

The original Greek of the key phrase "generation of vipers" is γεννημα εχιδνων (which also occurs in Matthew 12:34).

For a collection of other versions see BibleHub Matthew 3:7.

== Analysis ==
This verse is the beginning of a tirade by John the Baptist. This lecture is also found in Luke, with this verse being very similar to Luke 3:7. This section is not found in Mark and most scholars believe that Matthew and Luke are both copying from the hypothetical Q. The most important difference between the versions of Matthew and Luke is that in Luke's Gospel, John the Baptist speaks to the multitude that have come to see him, while Matthew has John addressing the Pharisees and Sadducees in particular.

The Pharisees and Sadducees were two powerful and competing factions within Judaism at the time. Throughout the New Testament, and especially in Matthew, the Pharisees are presented as opponents of Jesus and responsible for his crucifixion. Some versions translate the passage as saying they were coming "for baptism". The wording is ambiguous but based on the rest of the text most scholars feel that it is more appropriate to say they were coming "to the baptism" likely to observe and investigate this new movement, rather than to be baptized themselves. Alexander Jones notes that as the entrenched powers both groups would have reason to be deeply interested in new mass movements such as John's. However, the two acting in concert is, according to David Hill, quite ahistorical as the Pharisees and Sadducees were long and bitter rivals. The two groups reappear as a pair in Matthew 16. An alternative view is that the Pharisees and Sadducees are coming to be baptized, and that this reflects the mass popularity of John's program. it also incites his attack as he does not believe that many of those coming to him have truly repented. This would also close the distance between Matthew's speech directed at the Pharisees and Sadducees and Luke's to John's audience in general.

A number of theories have been advanced to explain why Matthew might be directing John's attack to these groups while Luke focuses on the general multitude. Schweizer feels that since Matthew was writing for a more Jewish audience than Luke the author of Matthew did not want to offend all Jews and thus focused only on the unpopular elites. At the time and place the author of Matthew was writing the Pharisees were staunch opponents of the new Christian movement, and the author of Matthew thus had motive to direct criticisms towards them. Most other scholars disagree with this view and they believe that the phrase "Pharisees and Sadducees" more likely refers to all Jews, in keeping with Luke. Hill notes that the author of Matthew might use the term Sadducee to refer to all non-Pharisee Jews. France believes Matthew is just mentioning the two most prestigious of the many groups that came to observe John.

Albright and Mann note that a viper's brood was a common expression at the time indicating those filled with malice. Jesus later uses the same turn of phrase in Matthew 12:34 and 23:33. France speculates that the term could be rooted in Jeremiah 46:22, which also connects to the tree metaphor in Matthew 3:10. Malina and Rohrbaugh note that the use of the word "offspring" implies a child not from a legitimate union. They suggest "snake bastards" is thus a more accurate translation. This also links to Matthew 3:9 where the Pharisees and Sadducees defend themselves by citing their lineage. This insult in this verse has been borrowed by a number of other writers, including Shakespeare in Troilus and Cressida, Anthony Trollope in Barchester Towers, Somerset Maugham in Catalina, and in the title of François Mauriac's Le noeud de viperes.

Albright and Mann note that it is important not to read the word wrath as a synonym for anger. Rather in Jewish and Christian thought it refers to the necessary meting out of final justice by an all loving God. Clarke notes that this phrase has been reused in other important contexts. In The Pilgrim's Progress it is a warning of "the wrath to come" by a character known as the Evangelist that sets the protagonist on his quest. John and Charles Wesley used the same phrase to advertise the Bible studies that would eventually grow into Methodism.

== Commentary from the Church Fathers ==
Gregory the Great: The words of the teachers should be fitted to the quality of the hearers, that in each particular it should agree with itself and yet never depart from the fortress of general edification.

Glossa Ordinaria: It was necessary that after the teaching which he used to the common people, the Evangelist should give an example of the doctrine he delivered to the more advanced; therefore he says, Seeing many of the Pharisees, &c.

Isidore of Seville: The Pharisees and Sadducees opposed to one another; Pharisee in the Hebrew signifies ‘divided;’ because choosing the justification of traditions and observances they were ‘divided’ or ‘separated’ from the people by this righteousness. Sadducee in the Hebrew means ‘just;’ for these laid claim to be what they were not, denied the resurrection of the body, and taught that the soul perished with the body; they only received the Pentateuch, and rejected the Prophets.

Glossa Ordinaria: When John saw those who seemed to be of great consideration among the Jews come to his baptism, he said to them, O generation of vipers, &c.

Saint Remigius: The manner of Scripture is to give names from the imitation of deeds, according to that of Ezekiel, Thy father was an Amorite; (Ezek. 16:3.) so these from following vipers are called generation of vipers.

Pseudo-Chrysostom: As a skilful physician from the colour of the skin infers the sick man's disease, so John understood the evil thoughts of the Pharisees who came to him. They thought perhaps, We go, and confess our sins; he imposes no burden on us, we will be baptized, and get indulgence for sin. Fools! if ye have eaten of impurity, must ye not needs take physic? So after confession and baptism, a man needs much diligence to heal the wound of sin; therefore he says, Generation of vipers. It is the nature of the viper as soon as it has bit a man to fly to the water, which, if it cannot find, it straightway dies; so this progeny of vipers, after having committed deadly sin, ran to baptism, that, like vipers, they might escape death by means of water. Moreover, it is the nature of vipers to burst the insides of their mothers, and so to be born. The Jews then are therefore called progeny of vipers, because by continual persecution of the prophets they had corrupted their mother the Synagogue. Also vipers have a beautiful and speckled outside, but are filled with poison within. So these men's countenances wore a holy appearance.

Saint Remigius: When then he asks, who will show you to flee from the wrath to come,—‘except God’ must be understood.

Pseudo-Chrysostom: Or who hath showed you? Was it Esaias? Surely no; had he taught you, you would not put your trust in water only, but also in good works; he thus speaks, Wash you, and be clean; put your wickedness away from your souls, learn to do well. (Is. 1:16.) Was it then David? who says, Thou shall wash me, and I shall he whiter than snow; (Ps. 51:7.) surely not, for he adds immediately, The sacrifice of God is a broken spirit. If then ye had been the disciples of David, ye would have come to baptism with mournings.

Saint Remigius: But if we read, shall show, in the future, this is the meaning, ‘What teacher, what preacher, shall be able to give you such counsel, as that ye may escape the wrath of everlasting damnation?’

Augustine: God is described in Scripture, from some likeness of effects, not from being subject to such weakness, as being angry, and yet is He never moved by any passion. The word ‘wrath’ is applied to the effects of his vengeance, not that God suffers any disturbing affection.

== Influence ==
"Generation of Vipers" was the title of a 1942 book by Philip Wylie which criticized American society.

Preceded by Matthew 3:6	Gospel of Matthew; Chapter 3	Succeeded by Matthew 3:8
