= Matthew 3:9 =

- ← 3:8 3:10 →
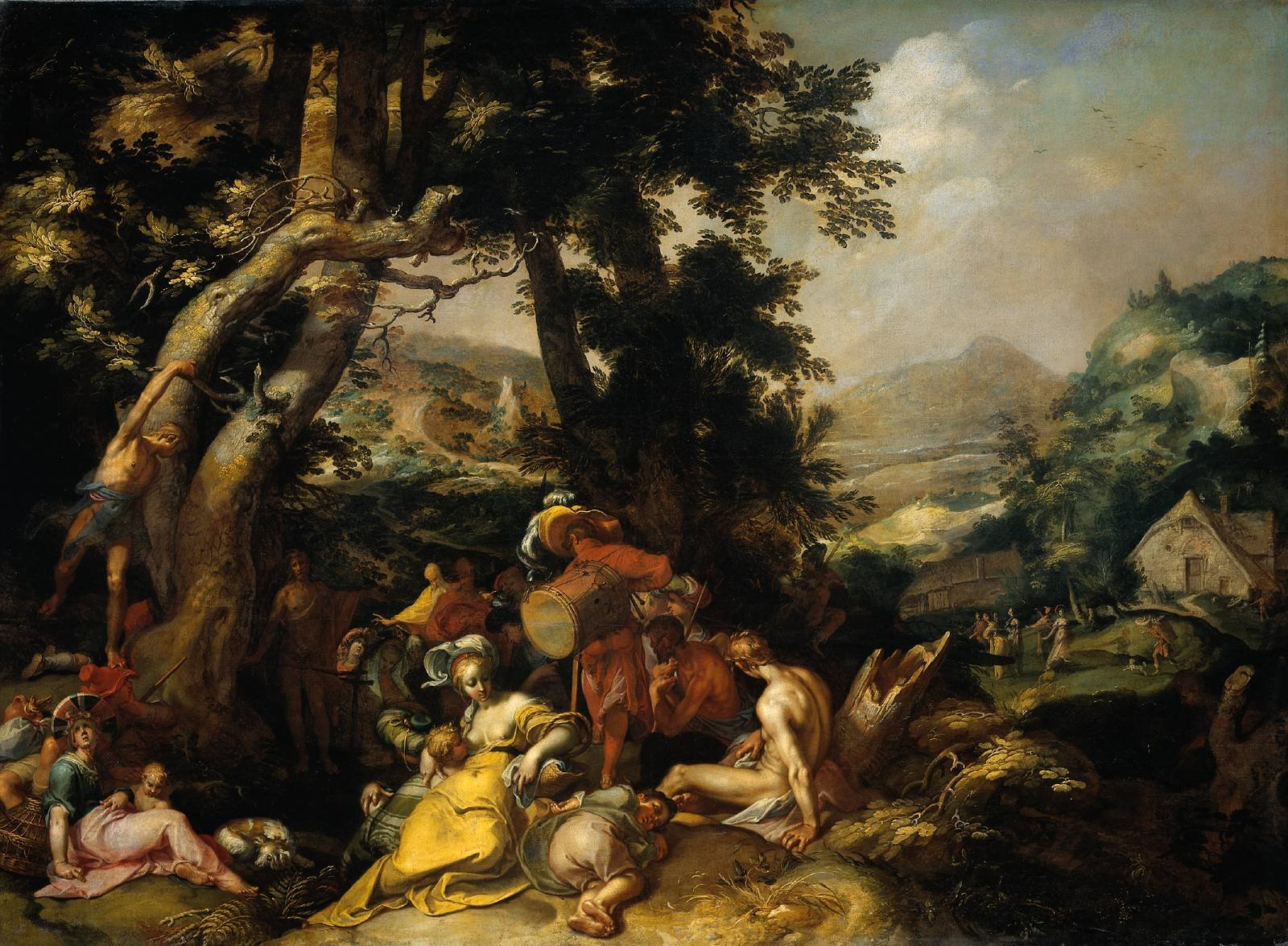
- Abraham Bloemaert's Landscape with the Ministry of John the Baptist, c. 1600
- Book: Gospel of Matthew
- Christian Bible part: New Testament

Matthew 3:9 is the ninth verse of the third chapter of the Gospel of Matthew in the New Testament. The verse describes an incident where John the Baptist berates the Pharisees and Sadducees. He has previously called them a brood of vipers and warned them of the wrath to come and has urged them to repent. In this verse he warns that their links to Abraham will not save them.

== Content ==
In the King James Version of the Bible the text reads:

And think not to say within yourselves,
We have Abraham to our father: for I
say unto you, that God is able of these
stones to raise up children unto Abraham.

The World English Bible translates the passage as:

Don't think to yourselves, ‘We have
Abraham for our father,’ for I tell
you that God is able to raise up
children to Abraham from these stones.

The 1881 Westcott-Hort Greek text is:

και μη δοξητε λεγειν εν εαυτοις
πατερα εχομεν τον αβρααμ
λεγω γαρ υμιν οτι δυναται ο θεος εκ των λιθων τουτων
εγειραι τεκνα τω αβρααμ

For a collection of other versions see BibleHub Matthew 3:9.

== Analysis ==
France does not believe that John the Baptist was attacking them for their reliance on bloodlines, rather he sees the phrase "Abraham for our father" as a reference to the exalted position within the political and religious hierarchy that the Pharisees and Sadducees felt would guarantee their salvation. This links with the overall theme of John's preaching that true repentance is the only path to salvation. Jesus uses the same reference to attack hypocrites in Matthew 8:11-12.

A second interpretation is that John is rejecting the then-popular notion of "merits of the fathers" or Zekhut Avot. This principle was that because of the righteousness of Abraham and the other patriarchs, all Jews were now the chosen people and could count on goodwill from God. John is saying that no such lineage would save them from judgement. The reference to creating new children of Abraham out of stone is an illustration of God's omnipotence and that he has no need for his current worshipers.

The "raising up of children to Abraham from these stones" is generally seen as wordplay as in Hebrew the word for stones is abanim and children is banim. France also believes the line is a reference to Isaiah 51:1-2 which calls Abraham "the rock from which you were hewn."

== Commentary from the Church Fathers ==
Chrysostom: He does not forbid them to say they are his, but to trust in that, neglecting virtues of the soul.

Pseudo-Chrysostom: What avails noble birth to him whose life is disgraceful? Or, on the other hand, what hurt is a low origin to him who has the lustre of virtue? It is fitter that the parents of such a son should rejoice over him, than he over his parents. So do not you pride yourselves on having Abraham for your father, rather blush that you inherit his blood, but not his holiness. He who has no resemblance to his father is possibly the offspring of adultery. These words then only exclude boasting on account of birth.

Rabanus Maurus: Because as a preacher of truth he wished to stir them up, to bring forth fruit meet for repentance, he invites them to humility, without which no one can repent.

Saint Remigius: There is a tradition, that John preached at that place of the Jordan, where the twelve stones taken from the bed of the river had been set up by command of God. He might then be pointing to these, when he said, Of these stones.

Jerome: He intimates God's great power, who, as he made all things out of nothing, can make men out of the hardest stone.

Glossa Ordinaria: It is faith's first lesson to believe that God is able to do whatever He will.

Chrysostom: That men should be made out of stones, is like Isaac coming from Sarah's womb; Look into the rock, says Isaiah, whence ye were hewn. Reminding them thus of this prophecy, he shows that it is possible that the like might even now happen.

Rabanus Maurus: Otherwise; the Gentiles may be meant who worshipped stones.

Pseudo-Chrysostom: Stone is hard to work, but when wrought to some shape, it loses it not; so the Gentiles were hardly brought to the faith, but once brought they abide in it forever.

Jerome: These stones signify the Gentiles because of their hardness of heart. See Ezekiel, I will take away from you the heart of stone, and give you the heart of flesh. Stone is emblematic of hardness, flesh of softness.

Rabanus Maurus: Of stones there were sons raised up to Abraham; forasmuch as the Gentiles by believing in Christ, who is Abraham's seed, became his sons to whose seed they were united.

== See also ==
- Abraham
- Related Bible parts: Isaiah 51, Ezekiel 33, John 8

Preceded by Matthew 3:8	Gospel of Matthew; Chapter 3	Succeeded by Matthew 3:10
