= Matthew 3:12 =

- ← 3:11 3:13 →
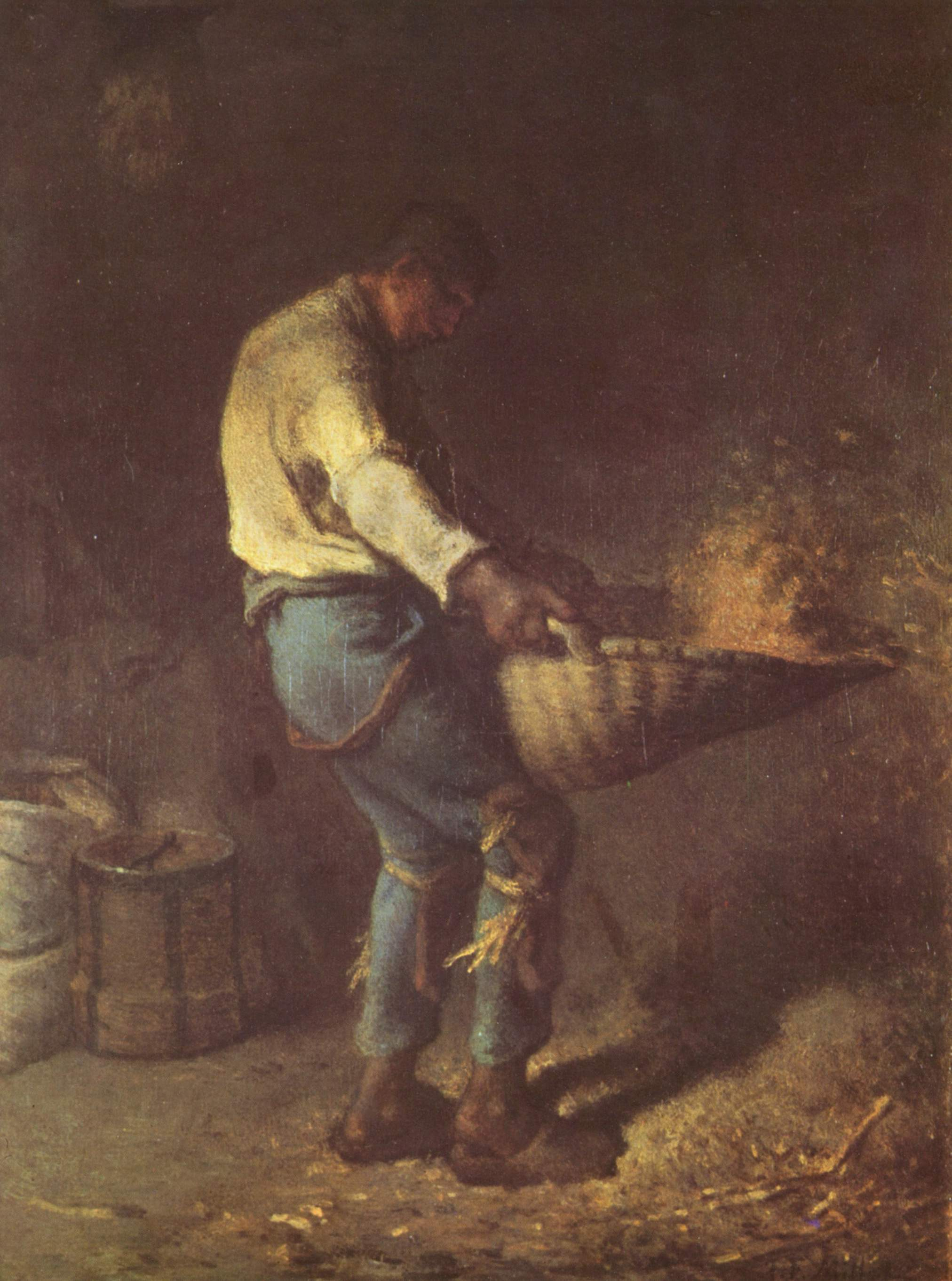
- Jean-François Millet's depiction of winnowing
- Book: Gospel of Matthew
- Christian Bible part: New Testament

Matthew 3:12 is the twelfth verse of the third chapter of the Gospel of Matthew in the New Testament. The verse occurs in the section relating the preachings of John the Baptist. In this he uses the imagery of harvesting wheat to describe God's judgement.

== Content ==
In Koine Greek it is:

οὗ τὸ πτύον ἐν τῇ χειρὶ αὐτοῦ, καὶ
διακαθαριεῖ τὴν ἅλωνα αὐτοῦ,
καὶ συνάξει τὸν σῖτον αὐτοῦ εἰς τὴν ἀποθήκην,
τὸ δὲ ἄχυρον κατακαύσει πυρὶ ἀσβέστῳ.
Hou to ptyon en tē cheiri autou, kai
diakathariei tēn alōna autou,
kai synaxei ton siton autou eis tēn apothēkēn
to de achyron katakausi pyri asbestō.

In the King James Version of the Bible the text reads:

Whose fan is in his hand, and
he will thoroughly purge his floor,
and gather his wheat into the
garner; but he will burn up
the chaff with unquenchable fire.

The World English Bible translates the passage as:

His winnowing fork is in his
hand, and he will thoroughly
cleanse his threshing floor. He
will gather his wheat into the
barn, but the chaff he will
burn up with unquenchable fire."

For a collection of other versions see BibleHub Matthew 3:12

== Analysis ==
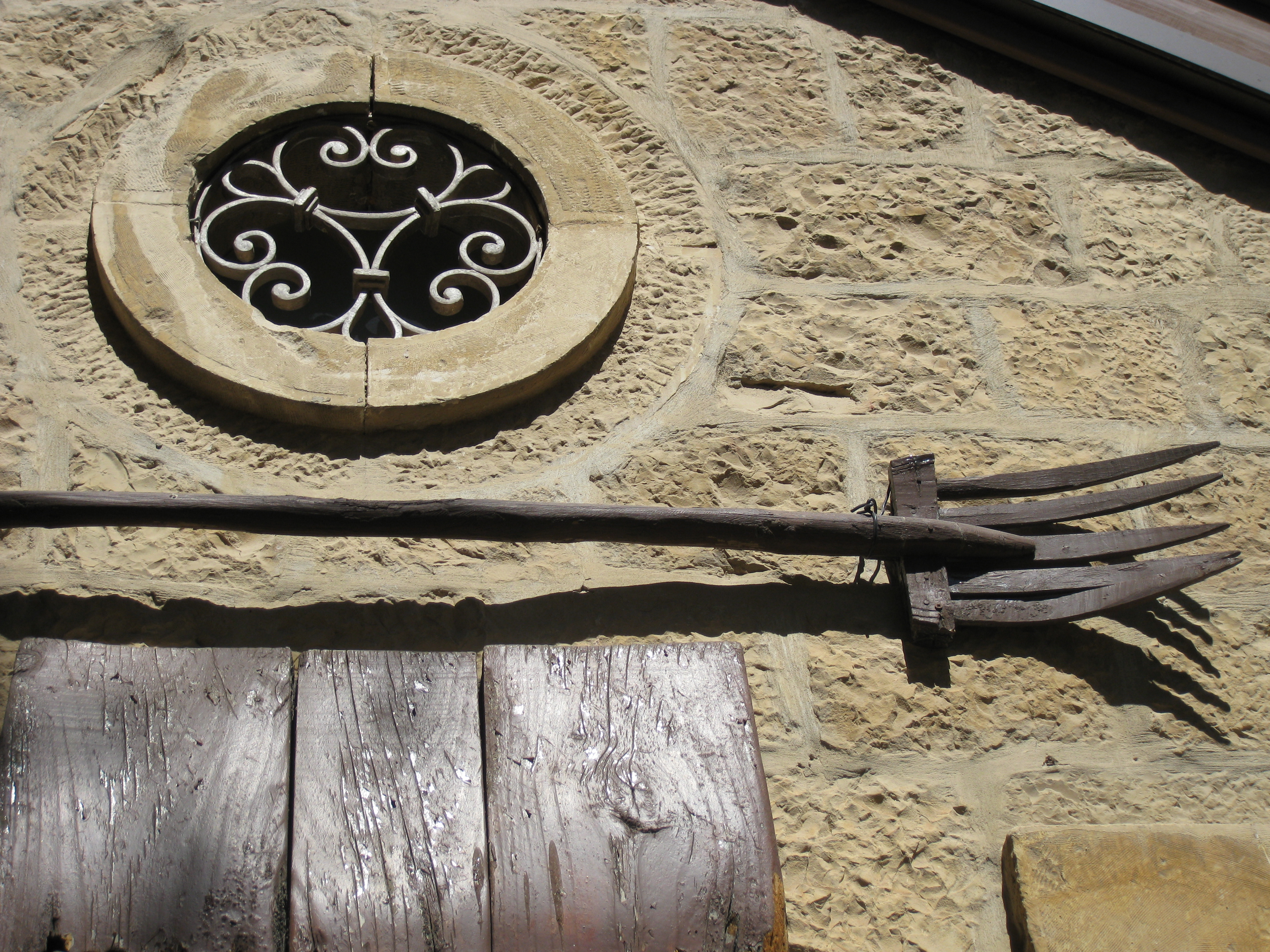
A winnowing fork

This verse describes wind winnowing, the period's standard process for separating the wheat from the chaff. Ptyon, the word translated as winnowing fork in the World English Bible is a tool similar to a pitchfork that would be used to lift harvested wheat up into the air into the wind. The wind would then blow away the lighter chaff allowing the edible grains to fall to the threshing floor, a large flat surface. The unneeded chaff would then be burned. As with the axe already placed against the tree in the preceding verse, the winnowing fork is already in hand, emphasizing the nearness of judgement.

Winnowing forks, generally made of wood, were common at the time, and several dating from this period have been found. Modern scholars mostly agree that the term "winnowing fork" is the most accurate but older versions have fan, shovel, broom, and other translations. In the Eastern Orthodox church the word was most often interpreted as broom and a common icon shows Christ holding a broom.

In this verse John the Baptist is still assumed to be addressing the Pharisees and Sadducees. The eschatological imagery is quite clear. The wheat represents those who are truly repentant, the chaff those like the Pharisees and Sadducees who are not. The messiah will clear the world, and those that are worthy would be brought into his "barn" while those that were unworthy will burn in unquenchable fire. France notes that unquenchable is in no way a synonym for eternal and that no doctrine of eternal damnation for the wicked should be read into this passage.

== Textual witnesses ==
Some early manuscripts containing the text of this verse are:

- Papyrus 101 (3rd century)
- Codex Vaticanus (~325–350)
- Codex Sinaiticus (~330–360)
- Codex Washingtonianus (~400)
- Codex Bezae (~400)
- Codex Ephraemi Rescriptus (~450)

== Commentary from the Church Fathers ==
Rabanus Maurus: By the fan is signified the separation of a just trial; that it is in the Lord's hand, means, ‘in His power,’ as it is written, The Father hath committed all judgment to the Son.

Pseudo-Chrysostom: The floor, is the Church, the barn, is the kingdom of heaven, the field, is the world. The Lord sends forth His Apostles and other teachers, as reapers to reap all nations of the earth, and gather them into the floor of the Church. Here we must be threshed and winnowed, for all men are delighted in carnal things as grain delights in the husk. But whoever is faithful and has the marrow of a good heart, as soon as he has a light tribulation, neglecting carnal things runs to the Lord; but if his faith be feeble, hardly with heavy sorrow; and he who is altogether void of faith, however he may be troubled, passes not over to God. The wheat when first thrashed lies in one heap with chaff and straw, and is after winnowed to separate it; so the faithful are mixed up in one Church with the unfaithful; but persecution comes as a wind, that, tossed by Christ's fan, they whose hearts were separate before, may be also now separated in place. He shall not merely cleanse, but thoroughly cleanse; therefore the Church must needs be tried in many ways till this be accomplished. And first the Jews winnowed it, then the Gentiles, now the heretics, and after a time shall Antichrist thoroughly winnow it. For as when the blast is gentle, only the lighter chaff is carried off, but the heavier remains; so a slight wind of temptation carries off the worst characters only; but should a greater storm arise, even those who seem steadfast will depart. There is need then of heavier persecution that the Church should be cleansed.

Saint Remigius: This His floor, to wit, the Church, the Lord cleanses in this life, both when by the sentence of the Priests the bad are put out of the Church, and when they are cut off by death.

Rabanus Maurus: The cleansing of the floor will then be finally accomplished, when the Son of Man shall send His Angels, and shall gather all offences out of His kingdom.

Gregory the Great: After the threshing is finished in this life, in which the grain now groans under the burden of the chaff, the fan of the last judgment shall so separate between them, that neither shall any chaff pass into the granary, nor shall the grain fall into the fire which consumes the chaff.

Hilary of Poitiers: The wheat, i. e. the full and perfect fruit of the believer, he declares, shall be laid up in heavenly barns; by the chaff he means the emptiness of the unfruitful.

Rabanus Maurus: There is this difference between the chaff and the tares, that the chaff is produced of the same seed as the wheat, but the tares from one of another kind. The chaff therefore are those who enjoy the sacraments of the faith, but are not solid; the tares are those who in profession as well as in works are separated from the lot of the good.

Saint Remigius: The unquenchable fire is the punishment of eternal damnation; either because it never totally destroys or consumes those it has once seized on, but torments them eternally; or to distinguish it from purgatorial fire which is kindled for a time and again extinguished.

Augustine: If any asks which were the actual words spoken by John, whether those reported by Matthew, or by Luke, or by Mark, it may be shown, that there is no difficulty here to him who rightly understands that the sense is essential to our knowledge of the truth, but the words indifferent. And it is clear we ought not to deem any testimony false, because the same fact is related by several persons who were present in different words and different ways. Whoever thinks that the Evangelists might have been so inspired by the Holy Ghost that they should have differed among themselves neither in the choice, nor the number, nor the order of their words, he does not see that by how much the authority of the Evangelists is preeminent, so much the more is to be by them established the veracity of other men in the same circumstances. But the discrepancy may seem to be in the thing, and not only in words, between, I am not worthy to bear His shoes, and, to loose His shoe-latchet. Which of these two expressions did John use? He who has reported the very words will seem to have spoken truth; he who has given other words, though he have not hid, or been forgetful, yet has he said one thing for another. But the Evangelists should be clear of every kind of falseness, not only that of lying, but also that of forgetfulness. If then this discrepancy be important, we may suppose John to have used both expressions, either at different times, or both at the same time. But if he only meant to express the Lord's greatness and his own humility, whether he used one or the other the sense is preserved, though any one should in his own words repeat the same profession of humility using the figure of the shoes; their will and intention does not differ. This then is a useful rule and one to be remembered, that it is no lie, when one fairly represents his meaning whose speech one is recounting, though one uses other words; if only one shows our meaning to be the same with his. Thus understood it is a wholesome direction, that we are to enquire only after the meaning of the speaker.

== See also ==
- Malachi 4:1

Preceded by Matthew 3:11	Gospel of Matthew; Chapter 3	Succeeded by Matthew 3:13
