= Matthew 3:4 =

- ← 3:3 3:5 →
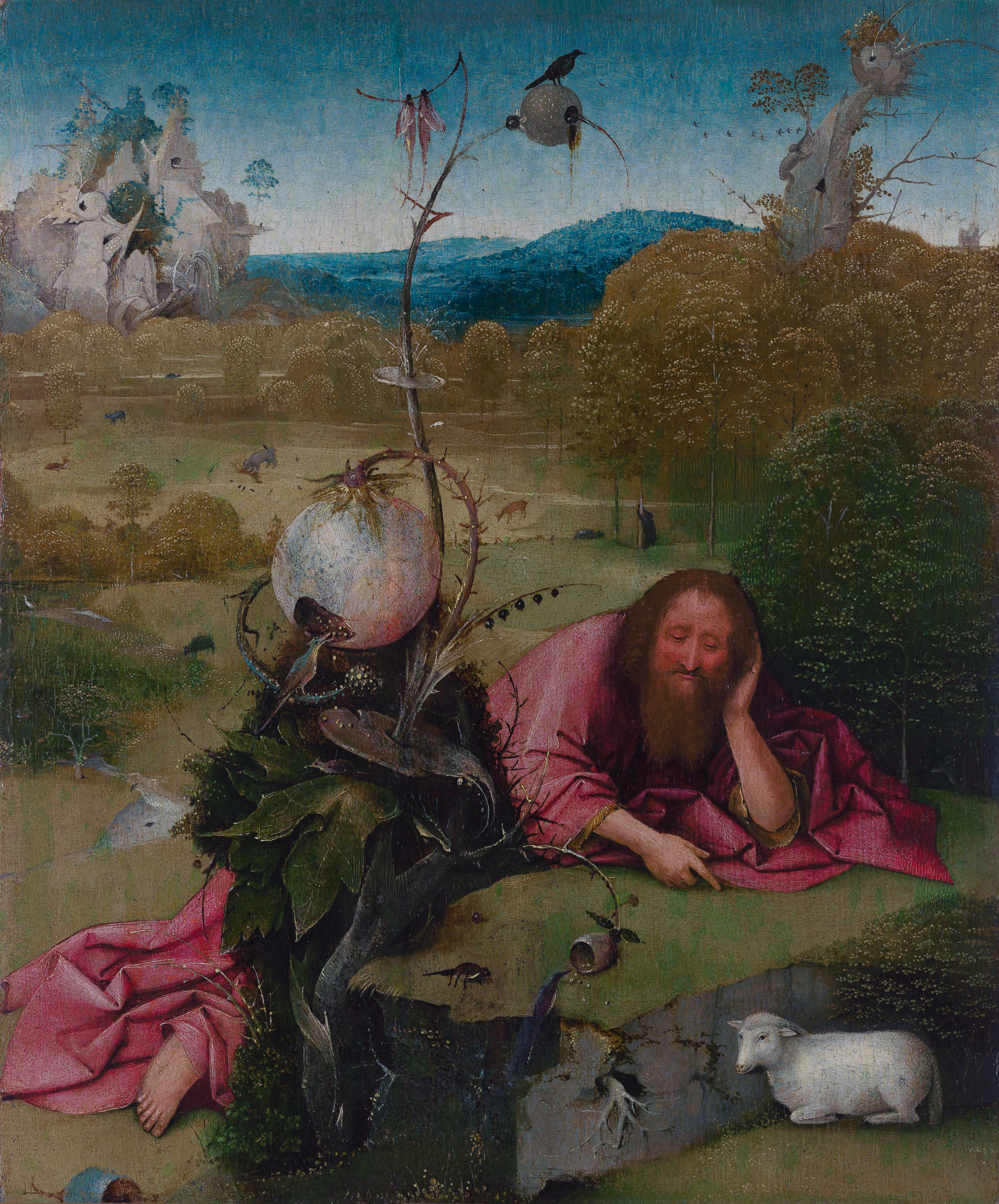
- Hieronymus Bosch's St. John the Baptist in the Wilderness
- Book: Gospel of Matthew
- Christian Bible part: New Testament

Matthew 3:4 is the fourth verse of the third chapter of the Gospel of Matthew in the New Testament. The verse occurs in the section introducing John the Baptist with this verse describing his clothing and diet.

== Content ==
In the King James Version of the Bible the text reads:

And the same John had his raiment
of camel's hair, and a leathern
girdle about his loins; and his
meat was locusts and wild honey.

The World English Bible translates the passage as:

Now John himself wore clothing
made of camel's hair, with a
leather belt around his waist.
His food was locusts and wild honey.

The 1881 Westcott-Hort text is:

αυτος δε ο ιωαννης ειχεν το ενδυμα αυτου απο τριχων καμηλου
και ζωνην δερματινην περι την οσφυν αυτου
η δε τροφη ην αυτου ακριδες και μελι αγριον

For a collection of other versions see BibleHub Matthew 3:4

== Analysis ==
Biblical scholar John Nolland notes that the decision by the author of Matthew to provide a description of John's clothing and diet shows that both are unusual and worth commenting on. That nowhere in the Gospel does the author give a description of Jesus' or his disciples' clothing thus indicates that they did not adopt any form of atypical dress.

This verse played an important role in the development of Christian monasticism, with John the Baptist viewed as a model ascetic. The sparse food and uncomfortable clothing, including the wearing of hairshirts became seen as the ideal of Christian asceticism. John Calvin wholly rejected this interpretation. He did not see this verse presenting John the Baptist as an ideal, but rather presenting an accurate portrait of one forced to live in the wilderness. To Calvin, John's holiness and popularity arose not because of his asceticism but in spite of it.

The description of John the Baptist's clothing is believed by most scholars to be a deliberate echo that of the prophet Elijah, who in 2 Kings 1:8 is said to wear "a garment of hair and with a leather belt around his waist." Jerome also appears to hold this position saying, "His girdle of skin, which Elijah also wore, is the mark of mortification." Nolland notes that nowhere outside the Gospels is camel hair mentioned as being the clothing of an ascetic. The only reference to camel hair clothing he knows of is in the Apollonius paradoxographus, which speaks of a luxurious garment made of smooth camel hair. More common for the very poor would have been clothing made of goat hair. However, in the Old Testament, in Zachariah 13:4 it is written: “On that day every prophet will be ashamed of their prophetic vision. They will not put on a prophet’s garment of hair in order to deceive", so one can safely assume a garment of hair was the clothing of a prophet in Judaic tradition. In modern times, the Cashmere and Camel Hair Manufacturers' Institute states that "camel hair garments are worn by native desert travelers to protect them from the heat".

John the Baptist's diet has been the centre of much discussion. For many years, the Greek: ἀκρίδες (akrides) was interpreted as referring not to locusts, the insect, but rather to the seed pods of the carob tree. But the Greek word is not used this way, and this notion is generally rejected today. Locusts are mentioned 22 other times in the Bible and all other mentions quite clearly refer to the insect. Locusts are still commonly eaten in Arabia. Eaten either raw or roasted they are quite nutritious and a source of many vitamins. While most insects were considered unclean under Mosaic law, Leviticus 11:22 specifically states that locusts are permitted. Portraying John the Baptist as eating seed pods rather than insects is possibly due to squeamishness about having such a revered figure eating insects and also a belief that a true ascetic should be completely vegetarian. What is meant by honey is also disputed. While bee honey was a common food in the area at the time, Jones believes that it refers to the tree gum from the tamarisk tree, a tasteless but nutritious liquid, rather than the honey made by bees.

== Commentary from the Church Fathers ==
Pseudo-Chrysostom: Having said that he is the voice of one crying in the desert, the Evangelist well adds, John had his clothing of camel's hair; thus showing what his life was; for he indeed testified of Christ, but his life testified of himself. No one is fit to be another's witness till he has first been his own.

Hilary of Poitiers: For the preaching of John no place more suitable, no clothing more useful, no food more fitted.

Jerome: His raiment of camel's hair, not of wool—the one the mark of austerity in dress, the other of a delicate luxury.

Pseudo-Chrysostom: It becomes the servants of God to use a dress not for elegant appearance, or for cherishing of the body, but for a covering of the nakedness. Thus John wears a garment not soft and delicate, but hairy, heavy, rough, rather wounding the skin than cherishing it, that even the very clothing of his body told of the virtue of his mind. It was the custom of the Jews to wear girdles of wool; so he desiring something less indulgent wore one of skin.

Jerome: Food moreover suited to a dweller in the desert, no choice viands, but such as satisfied the necessities of the body.

Rabanus Maurus: Content with poor fare; to wit, small insects and honey gathered from the trunks of trees. In the sayings of Arnulphusa, Bishop of Gaul, we find that there was a very small kind of locust in the deserts of Judæa, with bodies about the thickness of a finger and short; they are easily taken among the grass, and when cooked in oil form a poor kind of food. He also relates, that in the same desert there is a kind of tree, with a large round leaf, of the colour of milk and taste of honey, so friable as to rub to powder in the hand, and this is what is intended by wild honey.

Saint Remigius: In this clothing and this poor food, he shows that he sorrows for the sins of the whole human race.

Rabanus Maurus: His dress and diet express the quality of his inward conversation. His garment was of an austere quality, because he rebuked the sinner's life.

Jerome: His girdle of skin, which Elias also bare, is the mark of mortification.

Rabanus Maurus: He ate locusts and honey, because his preaching was sweet to the multitude, but was of short continuance; and honey has sweetness, locusts a swift flight but soon fall to the ground.

Saint Remigius: In John (which name is interpreted ‘the grace of God,’) is figured Christ who brought grace into the world; in his clothing, the Gentile Church.

Hilary of Poitiers: The preacher of Christ is clad in the skins of unclean beasts, to which the Gentiles are compared, and so by the Prophets’ dress is sanctified whatever in them was useless or unclean. The girdle is a thing of much efficacy to every good work, that we may be girt for every ministry of Christ. For his food are chosen locusts, which fly the face of man, and escape from every approach, signifying ourselves who were borne away from every word or speech of good by a spontaneous motion of the body, weak in will, barren in works, fretful in speech, foreign in abode, are now become the food of the Saints, chosen to fill the Prophets’ desire, furnishing our most sweet food not from the hives of the law, but from the trunks of wild trees.

Preceded by Matthew 3:3	Gospel of Matthew; Chapter 3	Succeeded by Matthew 3:5
