= Matthew 3:8 =

- ← 3:7 3:9 →
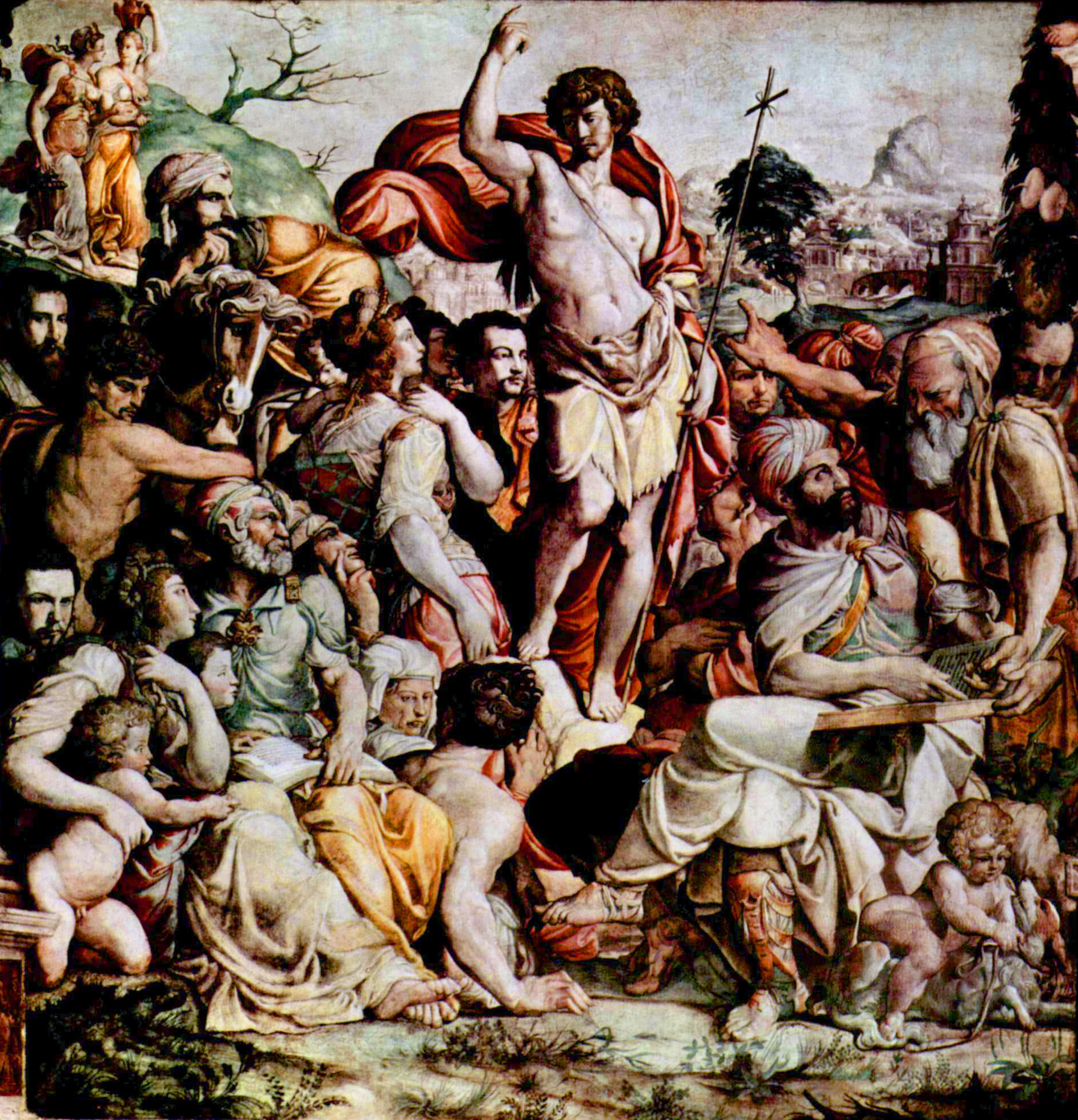
- Jacopo del Conte's depiction of the sermon of John the Baptist, 1538
- Book: Gospel of Matthew
- Christian Bible part: New Testament

Matthew 3:8 is the eighth verse of the third chapter of the Gospel of Matthew in the New Testament. The verse occurs in where John the Baptist is berating the Pharisees and Sadducees. He has previously called them a brood of vipers and warned them of the wrath to come. In this verse he urges them to repent.

== Content ==
In the King James Version of the Bible the text reads:

Bring forth therefore
fruits meet for repentance:

The World English Bible translates the passage as:

Therefore bring forth
fruit worthy of repentance!

The 1881 Westcott-Hort Greek text is:

ποιησατε ουν
καρπον αξιον της μετανοιας

For a collection of other versions see BibleHub Matthew 3:8.

== Analysis ==
Like the rest of this section this verse is mirrored in the Gospel of Luke, with this passage appearing in Luke 3:8. The lone difference from Luke is that the word fruit is pluralized in Matthew.

This is the first appearance of a fruit metaphor that will recur in Matthew 7:16 and appears in other parts of the New Testament. As the growing of fruit is the clear and outward manifestation of a healthy tree the term is seen as a metaphor for the good works of a true Christian. The call for repentance echoes Matthew 3:2 and links into the eschatological tone of this chapter.

How these good works link to repentance is a source of much dispute. There are two different interpretations of this passage. The phrase could be read as saying that the Pharisees and Sadducees should do good works in order to be repentant. The other view is that good works are only an outgrowth of internal repentance as a fruit is the product of a healthy tree. The first interpretation is that held by Catholics and the second by Protestants. According to Clarke the modern scholarly consensus is that the wording of this verse is ambiguous and both interpretations are plausible.

This verse thus became a part of the larger debate over the Protestant doctrine of the justification of faith. Protestants adopted the fruit metaphor in a number of important works. The Augsburg Confession, for instance, states that "it is taught among us that such faith should produce good fruits and good works and that we must do all such good works as God has commanded, but we should do them for God’s sake and not place our trust in them as if thereby to merit favor before God."

== Commentary from the Church Fathers ==
Glossa Ordinaria: If then ye would escape this wrath, Bring forth fruits meet for repentance.

Gregory the Great: Observe, he says not merely fruits of repentance, but fruits meet for repentance. For he who has never fallen into things unlawful, is of right allowed the use of all things lawful; but if any hath fallen into sin, he ought so far to put away from him even things lawful, as far as he is conscious of having used unlawful things. It is left then to such man's conscience to seek so much the greater gains of good works by repentance, the greater loss he has brought on himself by sin. The Jews who gloried in their race, would not own themselves sinners because they were Abraham's seed. Say not among yourselves we are Abraham's seed.

== Bibliography ==
- Albright, W.F. and C.S. Mann. "Matthew." The Anchor Bible Series. New York: Doubleday & Company, 1971.
- Clarke, Howard W. The Gospel of Matthew and its Readers: A Historical Introduction to the First Gospel. Bloomington: Indiana University Press, 2003.
- France, R.T. The Gospel According to Matthew: an Introduction and Commentary. Leicester: Inter-Varsity, 1985.

Preceded by Matthew 3:7	Gospel of Matthew; Chapter 3	Succeeded by Matthew 3:9
