= Matthew 3 =

- ← chapter 2 chapter 4 →
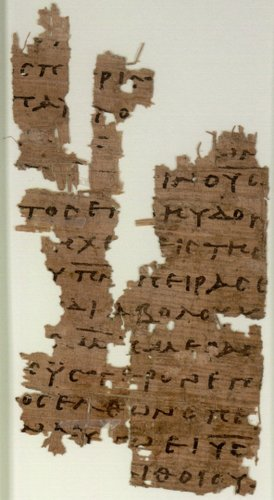
- Matthew 3:10–12 on Papyrus 101 (AD 250)
- Book: Gospel of Matthew
- Category: Gospel
- Christian Bible part: New Testament
- Order in the Christian part: 1

Matthew 3 is the third chapter of the Gospel of Matthew in the New Testament. It is the first chapter dealing with the ministry of Jesus, with events taking place some three decades after the close of the infancy narrative related in the previous two chapters. The focus of this chapter is on the preaching of John the Baptist and the Baptism of Jesus.

For the first time since Matthew 1:1 there are clear links with the Gospel of Mark. Many scholars are certain that a good portion of this chapter is a reworking of Mark 1. The chapter also parallels Luke 3, also believed to be based on Mark 1. A number of passages shared by Luke and Matthew, but not found in Mark, are commonly ascribed to the hypothetical source 'Q'.

== Text ==
The original text was written in Koine Greek. This chapter is divided into 17 verses.

=== Textual witnesses ===
Some early manuscripts containing the text of this chapter are: (Note: The extant Codex Alexandrinus does not contain this chapter due to a lacuna.)

- Papyrus Oxyrhynchus 405 (~200; extant verses 16–17)
- Papyrus 101 (3rd century; extant verses 10–12; 16–17)
- Codex Vaticanus (~325–350; complete)
- Codex Sinaiticus (~330–360; complete)
- Codex Washingtonianus (~400)
- Codex Bezae (~400; complete)
- Codex Ephraemi Rescriptus (~450; complete)

== Summary ==
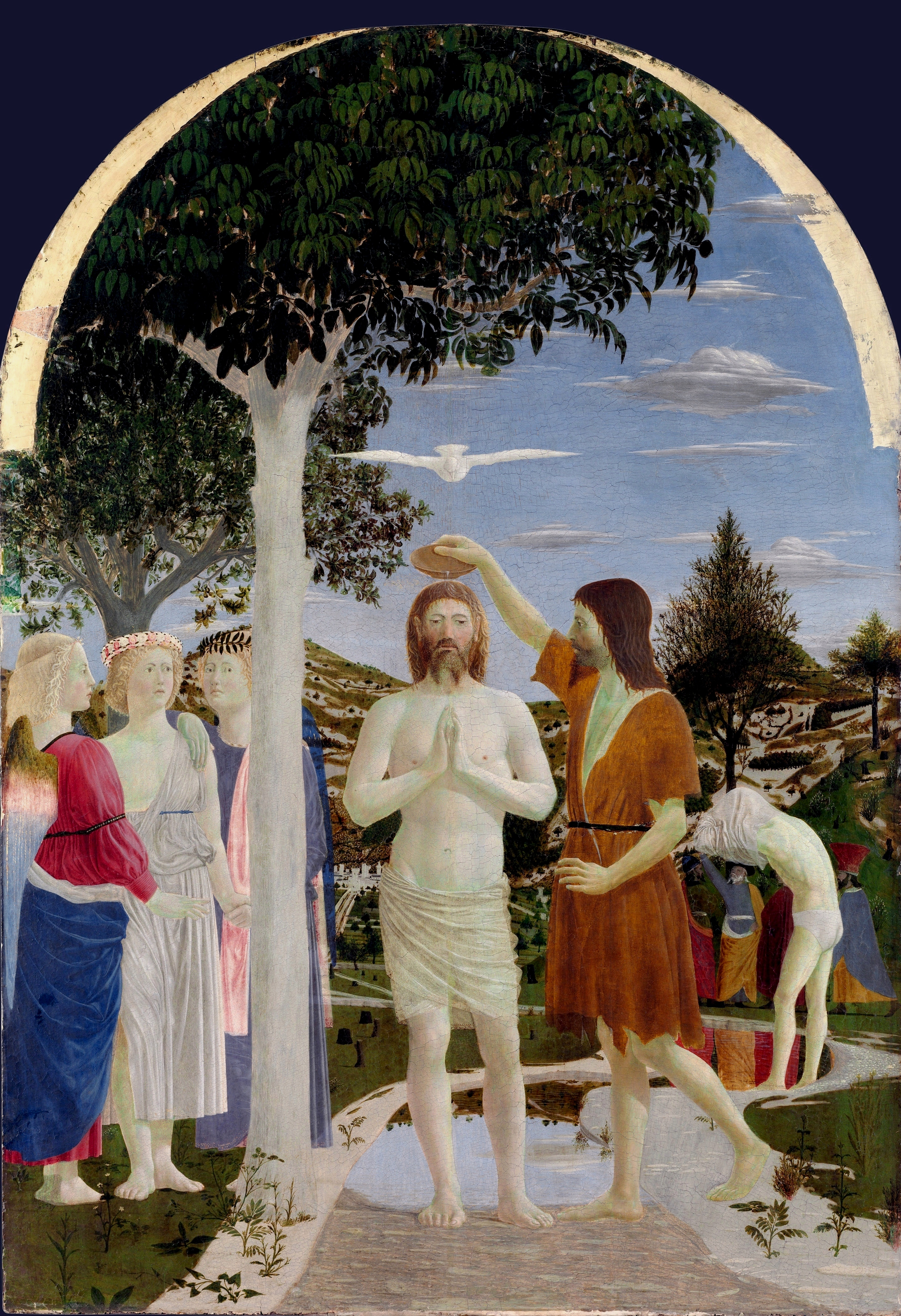
The Baptism of Jesus Christ by Piero della Francesca, c. 1448–1450

In the Jerusalem Bible (1966), this chapter launches the gospel's "narrative section" in which the Kingdom of Heaven is proclaimed. The Kingdom of Heaven is one of the key motifs within Matthew's gospel. The chapter opens with a portrait of John the Baptist. It describes his preaching, clothing, and diet, presenting him as a preacher in the wilderness prophesizing about the "wrath to come". The chapter then moves to a tirade, ascribed to John, against the Pharisees and Sadducees in which he warns them to repent. This includes the famous "brood of vipers" line at Matthew 3:7. Jesus then arrives from Galilee to be baptized, at a location about 70–80 miles from Nazareth, around the same section of Jordan River where Israelites crossed into the Promised Land under the leadership of Joshua. The chapter closes with the Baptism of Jesus, the voice of the Father, and the appearance of the Holy Spirit in the form of a dove.

== Full text ==
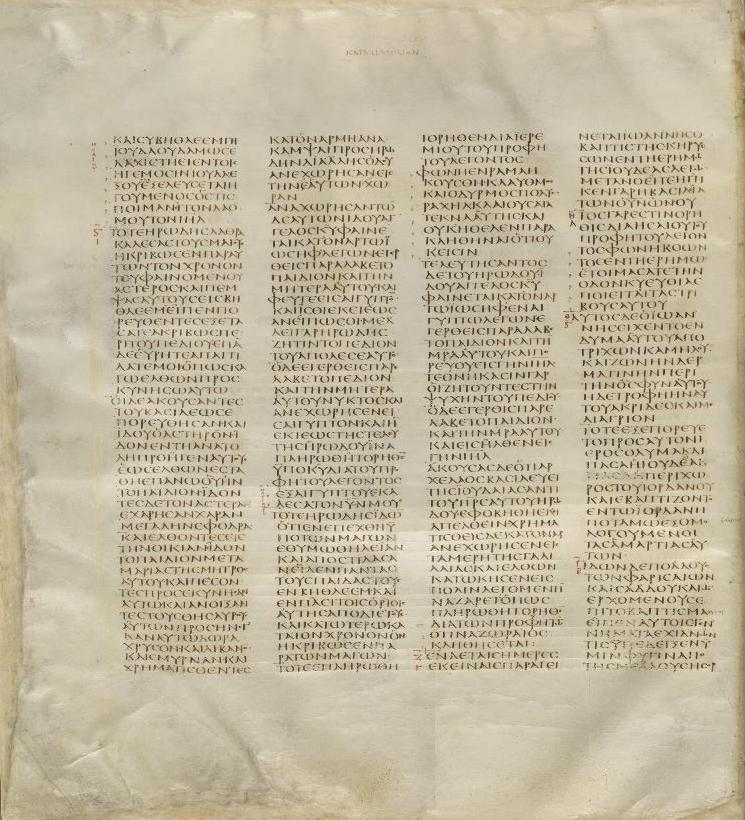
Codex Sinaiticus (c. AD 330–360), Matthew 2:5–3:7

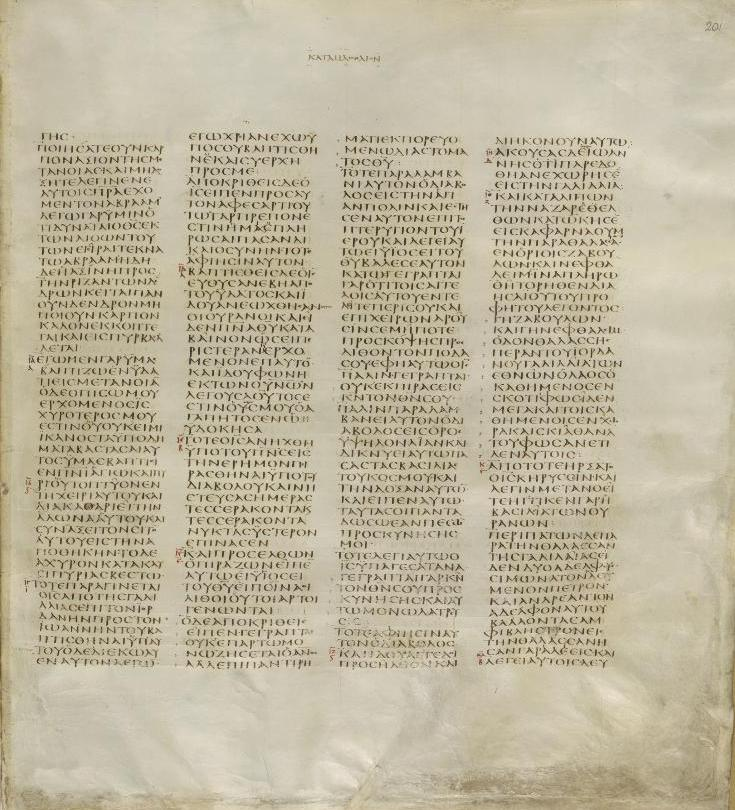
Codex Sinaiticus (c. AD 330–360), Matthew 3:7–4:19

In the King James Version, this chapter reads:

1 In those days came John the Baptist, preaching in the wilderness of Judaea,
2 And saying, Repent ye: for the kingdom of heaven is at hand.
3 this is he that was spoken of by the prophet Esaias, saying, The voice of one crying in the wilderness, Prepare ye the way of the Lord, make his paths straight.
4 And the same John had his raiment of camel's hair, and a leathern girdle about his loins; and his meat was locusts and wild honey.
5 Then went out to him Jerusalem, and all Judaea, and all the region round about Jordan,
6 And were baptized of him in Jordan, confessing their sins.
7 But when he saw many of the Pharisees and Sadducees come to his baptism, he said unto them, O generation of vipers, who hath warned you to flee from the wrath to come?
8 Bring forth therefore fruits meet for repentance:
9 And think not to say within yourselves, We have Abraham to our father: for I say unto you, that God is able of these stones to raise up children unto Abraham.
10 And now also the axe is laid unto the root of the trees: therefore every tree which bringeth not forth good fruit is hewn down, and cast into the fire.
11 I indeed baptize you with water unto repentance. but he that cometh after me is mightier than I, whose shoes I am not worthy to bear: he shall baptize you with the Holy Ghost, and with fire:
12 Whose fan is in his hand, and he will thoroughly purge his floor, and gather his wheat into the garner; but he will burn up the chaff with unquenchable fire.
13 Then cometh Jesus from Galilee to Jordan unto John, to be baptized of him.
14 But John forbad him, saying, I have need to be baptized of thee, and comest thou to me?
15 And Jesus answering said unto him, Suffer it to be so now: for thus it becometh us to fulfil all righteousness. Then he suffered him.
16 And Jesus, when he was baptized, went up straightway out of the water: and, lo, the heavens were opened unto him, and he saw the Spirit of God descending like a dove, and lighting upon him:
17 And lo a voice from heaven, saying, This is my beloved Son, in whom I am well pleased.

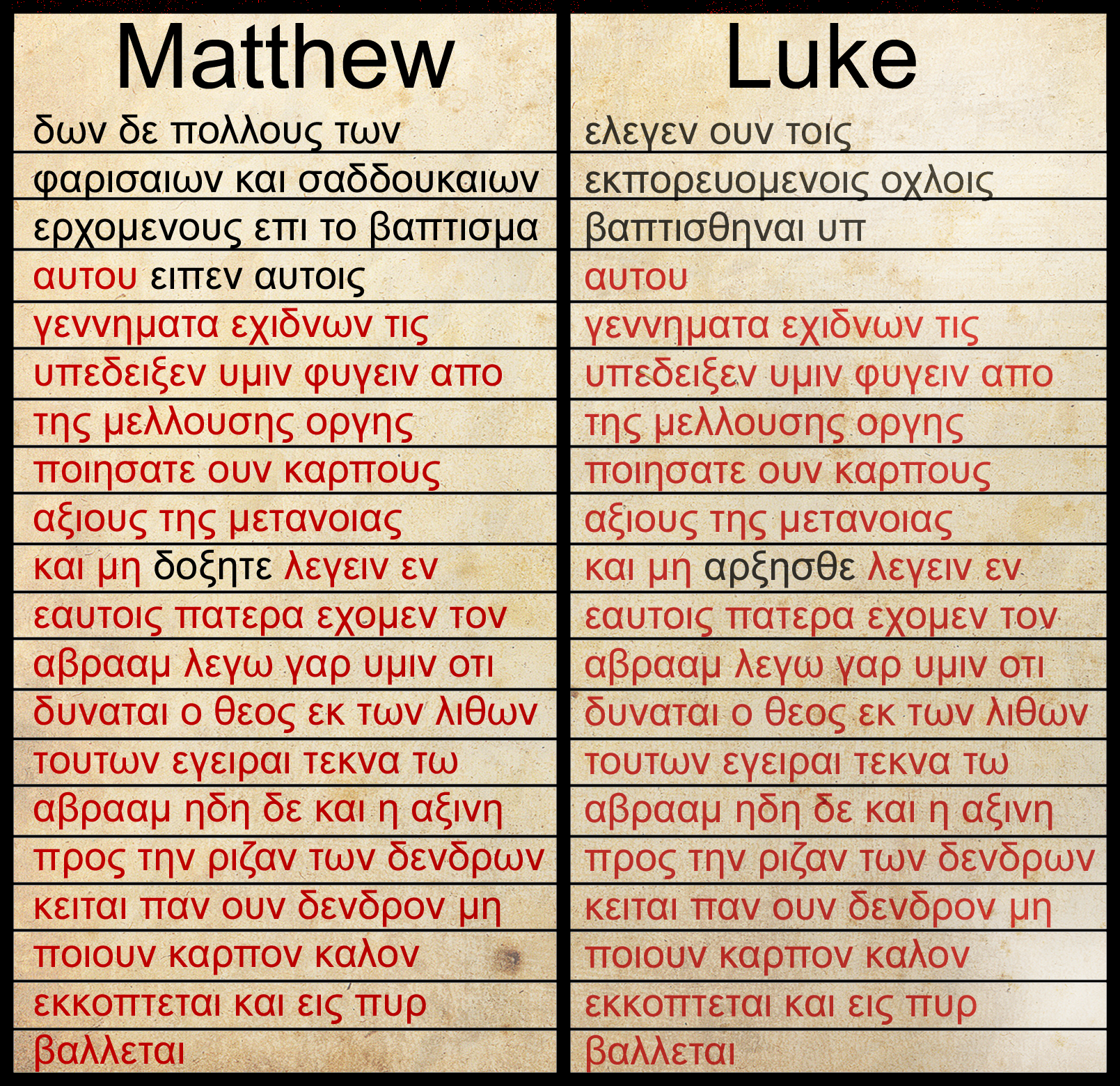
Comparison of Matthew 3:7–10 and Luke 3:7–9. Common text highlighted in red. From 1894 Scrivener New Testament.

== See also ==
- Abraham
- Baptism of Jesus
- Isaiah
- John the Baptist
- Related Bible parts: Leviticus 14, Psalm 2, Isaiah 40, Isaiah 51, Ezekiel 33, Mark 1, Luke 3, John 1, John 8, Acts 1, Acts 13, Hebrews 1, Hebrews 5

== Sources ==
- Albright, W.F. and C.S. Mann. "Matthew". The Anchor Bible Series. New York: Doubleday & Company, 1971.
- Allison, Dale C. Jr. (2007). "57. Matthew". In Barton, John; Muddiman, John (eds.). The Oxford Bible Commentary (first (paperback) ed.). Oxford University Press. ISBN 978-0199277186.
- Clarke, Howard W., The Gospel of Matthew and its Readers: A Historical Introduction to the First Gospel. Bloomington: Indiana University Press, 2003.
- Coogan, Michael David (2007). Coogan, Michael David; Brettler, Marc Zvi; Newsom, Carol Ann; Perkins, Pheme (eds.). The New Oxford Annotated Bible with the Apocryphal/Deuterocanonical Books: New Revised Standard Version, Issue 48 (Augmented 3rd ed.). Oxford University Press. ISBN 9780195288810.
- France, R.T. The Gospel According to Matthew: an Introduction and Commentary. Leicester: Inter-Varsity, 1985.
- France, R.T. (2007). Bruce, Frederick Fyvie (ed.). The Gospel of Matthew. New international commentary on the New Testament. Wm. B. Eerdmans Publishing. ISBN 9780802825018.
- Gundry, Robert H. Matthew a Commentary on his Literary and Theological Art. Grand Rapids: William B. Eerdmans Publishing Company, 1982.
- Guthrie, Donald. The New Bible Commentary, Grand Rapids: Eerdmans, 1970.
- Hill, David. The Gospel of Matthew. Grand Rapids: Eerdmans, 1981
- Keener, Craig S. (1999). A commentary on the Gospel of Matthew. Wm. B. Eerdmans Publishing. ISBN 978-0-8028-3821-6.
- Phillips, John (2005). Exploring the Gospel of Matthew: An Expository Commentary. The John Phillips Commentary Series. Vol. 1 (reprint ed.). Kregel Academic. ISBN 9780825433924.
- Schweizer, Eduard. The Good News According to Matthew. Atlanta: John Knox Press, 1975
