= Ezekiel 33 =

Book of Ezekiel, chapter 33

- ← chapter 32 chapter 34 →
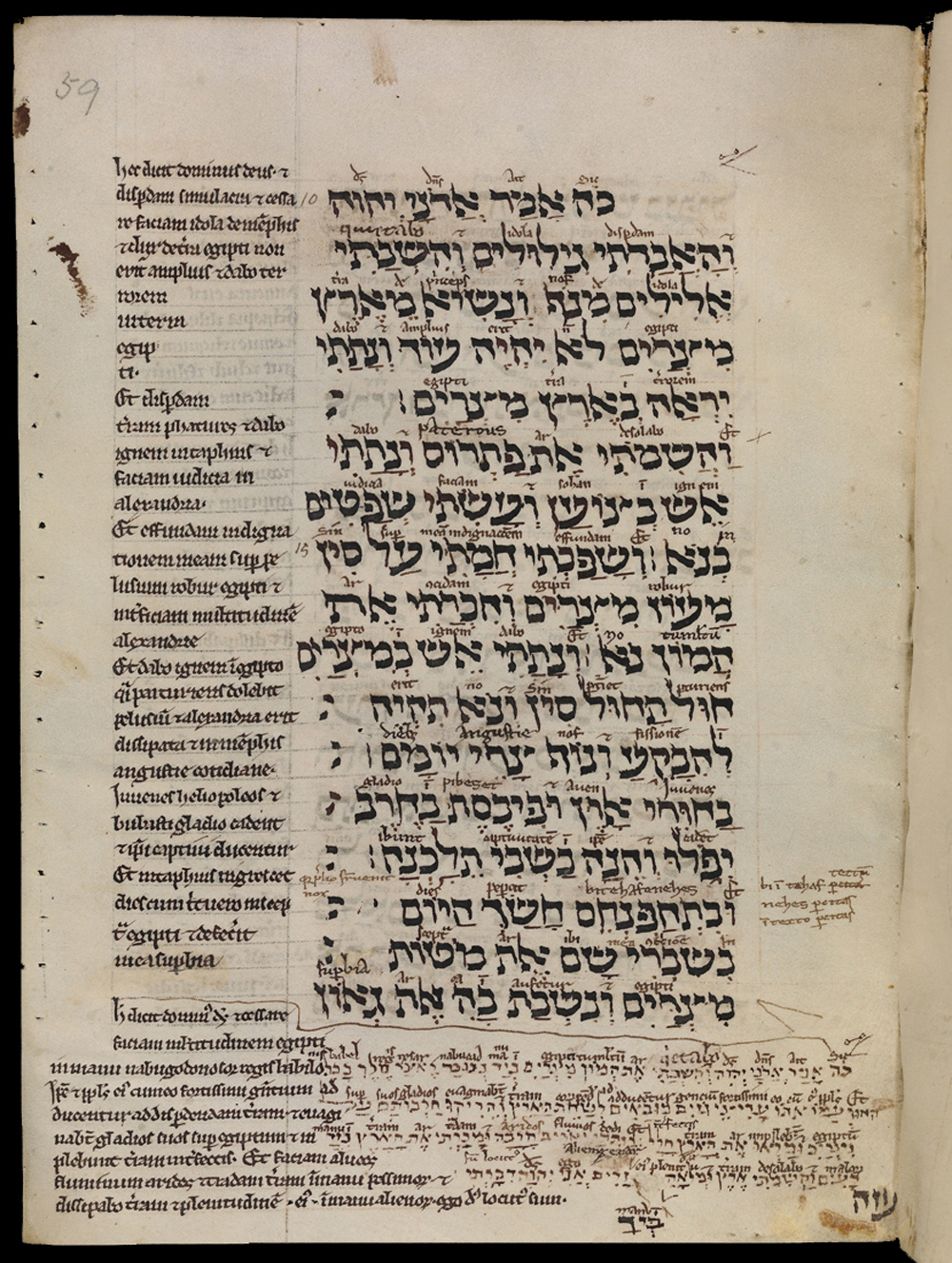
- Book of Ezekiel 30:13–18 in an English manuscript from the early 13th century, MS. Bodl. Or. 62, fol. 59a. A Latin translation appears in the margins with further interlineations above the Hebrew.
- Book: Book of Ezekiel
- Hebrew Bible part: Nevi'im
- Order in the Hebrew part: 7
- Category: Latter Prophets
- Christian Bible part: Old Testament
- Order in the Christian part: 26

Ezekiel 33 is the thirty-third chapter of the Book of Ezekiel in the Hebrew Bible or the Old Testament of the Christian Bible. This book contains the prophecies attributed to the prophet/priest Ezekiel, and is one of the Books of the Prophets. This chapter opens the third and final section of the book, in which God's future blessings on Israel are proclaimed. A "complex interweaving of themes imported from the first twenty-four chapters of the book" is concerned with the concept of responsibility, including Ezekiel's own responsibility as a "watchman" (verse 7), and "the people's responsibility for their own moral and religious choices" (see also chapter 18).

== Text ==
The original text was written in the Hebrew language. This chapter is divided into 33 verses.

=== Textual witnesses ===
Some early manuscripts containing the text of this chapter in Hebrew are of the Masoretic Text tradition, which includes the Codex Cairensis (895), the Petersburg Codex of the Prophets (916), Aleppo Codex (10th century), Codex Leningradensis (1008).

There is also a translation into Koine Greek known as the Septuagint, made in the last few centuries BC. Extant ancient manuscripts of the Septuagint version include Codex Vaticanus (B; $\mathfrak{G}$^{B}; 4th century), Codex Alexandrinus (A; $\mathfrak{G}$^{A}; 5th century) and Codex Marchalianus (Q; $\mathfrak{G}$^{Q}; 6th century). (Note: Ezekiel is missing from the extant Codex Sinaiticus.)

== Verse 7 ==
"So you, son of man: I have made you a watchman for the house of Israel;
therefore you shall hear a word from My mouth and warn them for Me." (NKJV)

- "Son of man" (Hebrew: בן־אדם ḇen-'ā-ḏām): this phrase is used 93 times to address Ezekiel, six times in this chapter.
- "Watchman" (Hebrew: צָפָה tsō-p̄eh or tsa-phah) or "sentinel": the noun is derived from the Hebrew verb meaning to "look out or about, spy, keep watch"; properly "to lean forward", i.e. "to peer into the distance"; by implication, "to observe, await:—behold, espy, look up (well), wait for, (keep the) watch(-man)". Ezekiel was first commissioned as a "watchman" in Ezekiel 3:16–21 and so biblical commentator Susan Galambush refers to this as "a new commission"; "ironically", she notes, "Ezekiel [is] commissioned to watch over a city that has already been destroyed".

== Verse 21 ==
And it came to pass in the twelfth year of our captivity, in the tenth month, on the fifth day of the month,
that one who had escaped from Jerusalem came to me and said,

"The city has been captured!" (NKJV)

- "The city has been captured" from the Hebrew sentence הכתה העיר huk-kə-ṯāh hā-'îr. The first word is derived from the verb נָכָה nâ-kâh, meaning "to smite", "to strike" mostly "in the sense of hurting." The second word means "the city" (עיר iyr means "city, town, abode of men")

The date corresponds to January 8, 585 BCE, based on an analysis by German theologian Bernhard Lang. Methodist commentator Joseph Benson notes that according to this reading, the news of the fall of Jerusalem reached Ezekiel, in Babylon, "one year, five months, and twenty-six days after the calamity happened", whereas the alternative reading in some ancient manuscripts, "in the eleventh year ..." is preferable, leaving only about six months as an interval.

== Verse 24 ==
"Son of man, they who inhabit those ruins in the land of Israel are saying, 'Abraham was only one, and he inherited the land. But we are many; the land has been given to us as a possession.'" (NKJV)

Cross reference: Isaiah 51:2; Matthew 3:9; John 8:33–39

== See also ==
- Abraham
- Israel
- Jerusalem
- Related Bible parts: 1 Samuel 14, 2 Kings 25, Jeremiah 52, Ezekiel 3, Hosea 9, Matthew 3, Matthew 28, John 8, Acts 20

== Bibliography ==
- Bromiley, Geoffrey W. (1995). International Standard Bible Encyclopedia: vol. iv, Q-Z. Eerdmans. ISBN 9780802837844.
- Brown, Francis; Briggs, Charles A.; Driver, S. R. (1994). The Brown-Driver-Briggs Hebrew and English Lexicon (reprint ed.). Hendrickson Publishers. ISBN 978-1565632066.
- Clements, Ronald E (1996). Ezekiel. Westminster John Knox Press. ISBN 9780664252724.
- Gesenius, H. W. F. (1979). Gesenius' Hebrew and Chaldee Lexicon to the Old Testament Scriptures: Numerically Coded to Strong's Exhaustive Concordance, with an English Index. Translated by Tregelles, Samuel Prideaux (7th ed.). Baker Book House.
- Joyce, Paul M. (2009). Ezekiel: A Commentary. Continuum. ISBN 9780567483614.
- Kee, Howard Clark; Meyers, Eric M.; Rogerson, John; Levine, Amy-Jill; Saldarini, Anthony J. (2008). Chilton, Bruce (ed.). The Cambridge Companion to the Bible (2, revised ed.). Cambridge University Press. ISBN 9780521691406.
- Würthwein, Ernst (1995). The Text of the Old Testament. Translated by Rhodes, Erroll F. Grand Rapids, MI: Wm. B. Eerdmans. ISBN 0-8028-0788-7.
