= Matthew 3:3 =

- ← 3:2 3:4 →
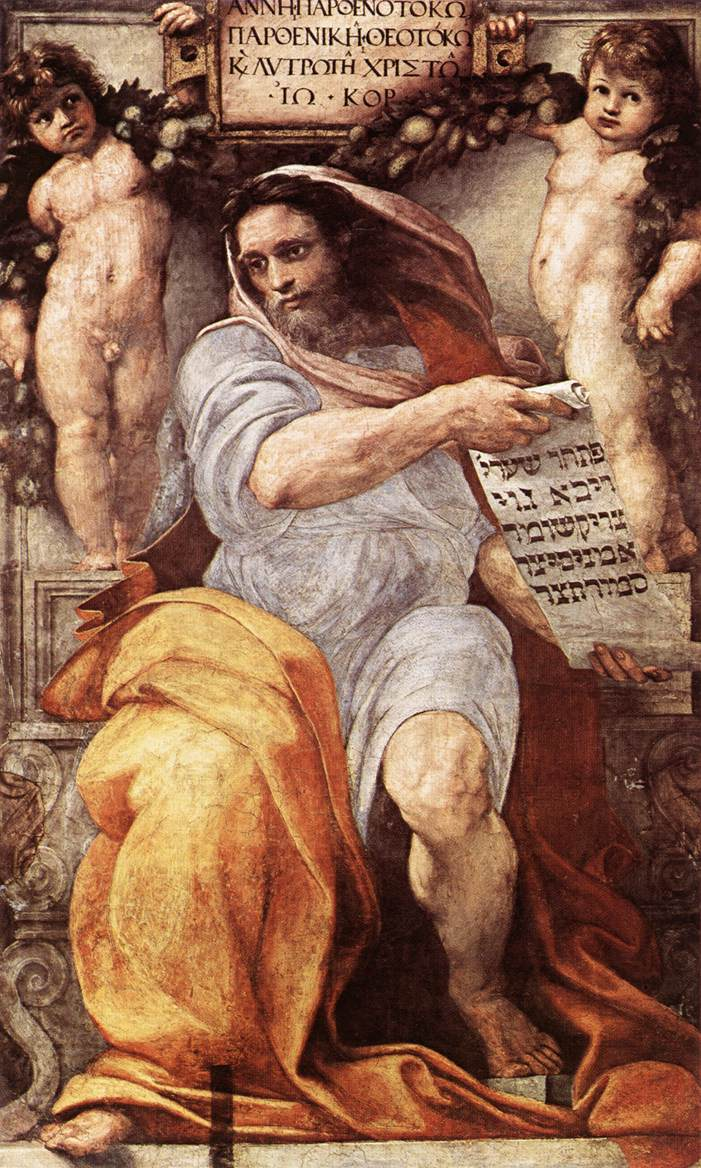
- Raphael's The Prophet Isaiah
- Book: Gospel of Matthew
- Christian Bible part: New Testament

Matthew 3:3 is the third verse of the third chapter of the Gospel of Matthew in the New Testament. The verse occurs in the section introducing John the Baptist, and links him to messianic prophecies.

== Content ==
In the King James Version of the Bible the text reads:

For this is he that was spoken
of by the prophet Esaias, saying,
The voice of one crying in the
wilderness, Prepare ye the way of
the Lord, make his paths straight.

The World English Bible translates the passage as:

For this is he who was spoken of by Isaiah the prophet,
saying, "The voice of one crying in the
wilderness, make ready the way of the
Lord. Make his paths straight."

The 1881 Westcott-Hort text is:

ουτος γαρ εστιν ο ρηθεις δια ησαιου του προφητου
λεγοντος φωνη βοωντος εν τη ερημω
ετοιμασατε την οδον κυριου ευθειας
ποιειτε τας τριβους αυτου

For a collection of other versions see BibleHub Matthew 3:3.

== Analysis ==
The quote in question comes from Isaiah 40:3. It originally was part of the description of the escape from the Babylonian Captivity. This same verse is quoted in Mark 1:3 and Luke 3:4. In Mark it is preceded by two other Old Testament quotes, Matthew moves these to 11:10. All three use the Septuagint version of Isaiah with one slight rewording. Where Isaiah has "make straight paths for God" becomes "make straight paths for him".

The author of Matthew does not introduce this quote with his standard "so it might be fulfilled" construction. Gundry argues that this was because while a figure like John the Baptist could complete a prophecy, only Jesus could fulfill them.

Hill notes that there are two main ways of punctuating this verse, which give somewhat different meanings. Traditionally the start of the quote was left as one phrase reading "the voice of one crying in the wilderness..." Based on the original Hebrew most modern scholars feel it should be two phrases reading "the voice of one crying: "In the wilderness..." This second punctuation makes the link between John the [Baptist] and Isaiah somewhat less direct.

== Commentary from the Church Fathers ==
Augustine: The other Evangelists omit these words of John. What follows, This is He, &c. it is not clear whether the Evangelist speaks them in his own person, or whether they are part of John's preaching, and the whole from Repent ye, to Esaias the prophet, is to be assigned to John. It is of no importance that he says, This is he, and not, I am he; for Matthew speaking of himself says, He found a man sitting at the toll-office; (Mat. 9:9.) not He found me. Though when asked what he said of himself, he answered, as is related by John the Evangelist, I am the voice of one crying in the wilderness.

Gregory the Great: It is well known that the Only-begotten Son is called the Word of the Father; as in John, In the beginning was the Word. (John 1:1.) But it is by our own speech that we are known; the voice sounds that the words may be heard. Thus John the forerunner of the Lord's coming is called, The voice, because by his ministry the voice of the Father is heard by men.

Pseudo-Chrysostom: The voice is a confused sound, discovering no secret of the heart, only signifying that he who utters it desires to say somewhat; it is the word that is the speech that openeth the mystery of the heart. Voice is common to men and other animals, word peculiar to man. John then is called the voice and not the word, because God did not discover His counsels through him, but only signified that He was about to do something among men; but afterwards by His Son he fully opened the mystery of his will.

Rabanus Maurus: He is rightly called, The voice of one crying, on account of the loud sound of his preaching. Three things cause a man to speak loud; when the person he speaks to is at a distance, or is deaf, or if the speaker be angry; and all these three were then found in the human race.

Glossa Ordinaria: John then is, as it were, the voice of the word crying. The word is heard by the voice, that is, Christ by John.

Bede: In like manner has He cried from the beginning through the voice of all who have spoken aught by inspiration. And yet is John only called, The voice; because that Word which others showed afar off, he declares as nigh.

Gregory the Great: Crying in the desert, because he shows to deserted and forlorn Judæa the approaching consolation of her Redeemer.

Saint Remigius: Though as far as historical fact is concerned, he chose the desert, to be removed from the crowds of people. What the purport of his cry was is insinuated, when he adds, Make ready the way of the Lord.

Pseudo-Chrysostom: As a great King going on a progress is preceded by couriers to cleanse what is foul, repair what is broken down; so John preceded the Lord to cleanse the human heart from the filth of sin, by the besom of repentance, and to gather by an ordinance of spiritual precepts those things which had been scattered abroad.

Gregory the Great: Every one who preacheth right faith and good works, prepares the Lord's way to the hearts of the hearers, and makes His paths straight, in cleansing the thoughts by the word of good preaching.

Glossa Ordinaria: Or, faith is the way by which the word reaches the heart; when the life is amended the paths are made straight.

== See also ==
- Related Bible parts: Isaiah 40, Mark 1, Luke 3, John 1

| Preceded by Matthew 3:2 | Gospel of Matthew; Chapter 3 | Succeeded by Matthew 3:4 |
