= Isaiah 51 =

Book of Isaiah, chapter 51

- ← chapter 50 chapter 52 →
- The Great Isaiah Scroll, the best preserved of the biblical scrolls found at Qumran from the second century BC, contains all the verses in this chapter.
- Book: Book of Isaiah
- Hebrew Bible part: Nevi'im
- Order in the Hebrew part: 5
- Category: Latter Prophets
- Christian Bible part: Old Testament
- Order in the Christian part: 23

Isaiah 51 is the fifty-first chapter of the Book of Isaiah in the Hebrew Bible or the Old Testament of the Christian Bible. This book contains the prophecies attributed to the prophet Isaiah, and is one of the Books of the Prophets. Chapters 40-55 are known as "Deutero-Isaiah" and date from the time of the Israelites' exile in Babylon. This chapter expresses the consolation of the Lord offered to the people of Israel.

== Text ==
The original text was written in the Hebrew language. This chapter is divided into 23 verses.

=== Textual witnesses ===
Some early manuscripts containing the text of this chapter in Hebrew are of the Masoretic Text tradition, which includes the Codex Cairensis (895), the Petersburg Codex of the Prophets (916), Aleppo Codex (10th century), Codex Leningradensis (1008).

Fragments containing parts of this chapter were found among the Dead Sea Scrolls (3rd century BCE or later):

- 1QIsa^{a}: complete
- 1QIsa^{b}: extant verses 1-11
- 4QIsa^{b} (4Q56): extant verses 14-16
- 4QIsa^{c} (4Q57): extant verses 1-16

There is also a translation into Koine Greek known as the Septuagint, made in the last few centuries BCE. Extant ancient manuscripts of the Septuagint version include Codex Vaticanus (B; $\mathfrak{G}$^{B}; 4th century), Codex Sinaiticus (S; BHK: $\mathfrak{G}$^{S}; 4th century), Codex Alexandrinus (A; $\mathfrak{G}$^{A}; 5th century) and Codex Marchalianus (Q; $\mathfrak{G}$^{Q}; 6th century).

== Parashot ==
The parashah sections listed here are based on the Aleppo Codex. Isaiah 51 is a part of the Consolations (Isaiah 40–66). {P}: open parashah; {S}: closed parashah.

{S} 51:1-3 {S} 51:4-6 {P} 51:7-8 {S} 51:9-11 {S} 51:12-16 {S} 51:17-21 {P} 51:22-23 {P}

== Verse 1 ==
“Listen to Me, you who follow after righteousness,

You who seek the Lord:

Look to the rock from which you were hewn,

And to the hole of the pit from which you were dug." (NKJV)

Cross reference: Matthew 3:9

== Verse 2 ==
“Look to Abraham your father,

And to Sarah who bore you;

For I called him alone,

And blessed him and increased him."

Sarah is mentioned alongside Abraham; Abraham is described as "the rock from which you [the Israelites] were hewn" and Sarah is described as "the hole of the pit from which you were dug", the latter being a reference to her maternal womb. Abraham was called when he was alone i.e. childless.

Cross reference: Ezekiel 33:24

== Verse 6 ==
Lift up your eyes to the heavens,

and look upon the earth beneath:

for the heavens shall vanish away like smoke,

and the earth shall wax old like a garment,

and they that dwell therein shall die in like manner:

but my salvation shall be for ever,

and my righteousness shall not be abolished.

A part of this verse is referred to by Jesus Christ as recorded in Matthew 24:35:

"Heaven and earth shall pass away, but my words shall not pass away."

== Verse 7 ==
Hearken unto me, ye that know righteousness,

the people in whose heart is my law;

fear ye not the reproach of men,

neither be ye afraid of their revilings.

A part of this verse is referred to by Jesus Christ as recorded in Matthew 5:11:

"Blessed are ye, when men shall revile you,

and persecute you,

and shall say all manner

of evil against you falsely, for my sake."

== Awake, awake! ==
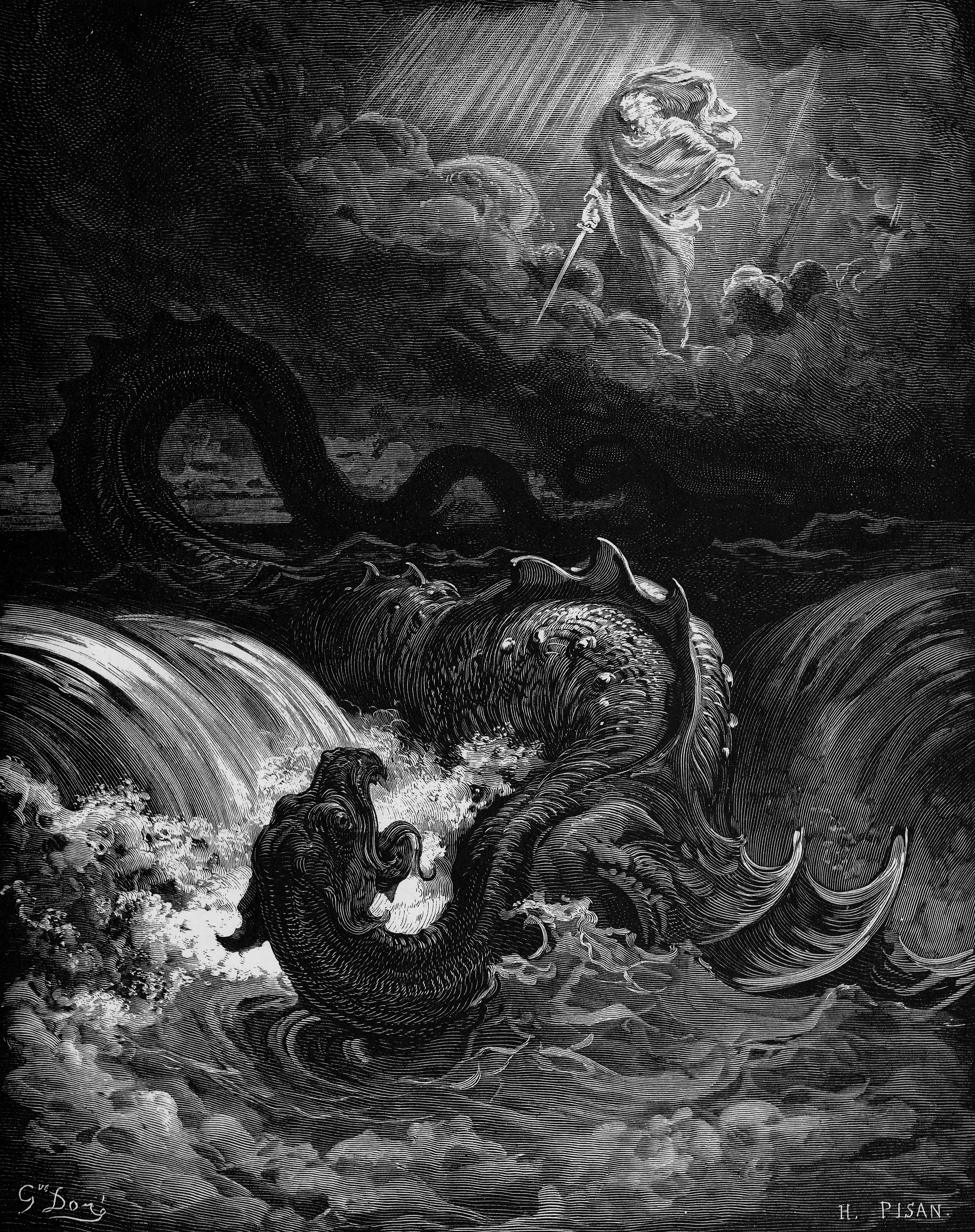
"A war that God waged against a multitude of challengers--the deep, the sea, Rahab the sea monster, the rivers, Leviathan the Twisting Serpent, Leviathan the Elusive Serpent, and the sea dragons--is referred to in the psalms, the prophecies, and in Isaiah 51:9-10."

Verse 9:

Awake, awake, put on strength,
O arm of the Lord!

Repeated in verse 17:

Awake, awake,
Stand up, O Jerusalem.

John Skinner, in the Cambridge Bible for Schools and Colleges, considers it is "difficult to decide" whether the words in verse 9 are addressed to the Lord "by the prophet himself, or by the community of true Israelites". Skinner presents verses 9-10 as a prayer for divine intervention and verses 12-16 as "the divine answer to this prayer".

Are You not the arm that cut Rahab apart,
And wounded the serpent?

The reference to Rahab is to Egypt, not to the Rahab associated with the Israelites' capture of Jericho in Joshua 2:1–24. Use of the name as a symbol for Egypt "rests on the conception of a conflict in days long past between Jehovah and the monsters called Rahab and the Dragon". In Psalm 89, the Lord "rules the raging of the sea" and "breaks Rahab in pieces".

== See also ==
- Abraham
- Christian messianic prophecies
- Christianity and Judaism
- Crossing the Red Sea
- Eden
- Jerusalem
- Jewish messianism
- Messianic prophecies of Jesus
- Sarah
- Zion
- Related Bible parts: Exodus 14, Isaiah 2, Isaiah 42, Ezekiel 33, Matthew 3, Matthew 5, Matthew 24

== Bibliography ==
- Ulrich, Eugene, ed. (2010). The Biblical Qumran Scrolls: Transcriptions and Textual Variants. Brill.
- Würthwein, Ernst (1995). The Text of the Old Testament. Translated by Rhodes, Erroll F. Grand Rapids, MI: Wm. B. Eerdmans. ISBN 0-8028-0788-7.
