= Matthew 3:1 =

- ← 2:23 3:2 →
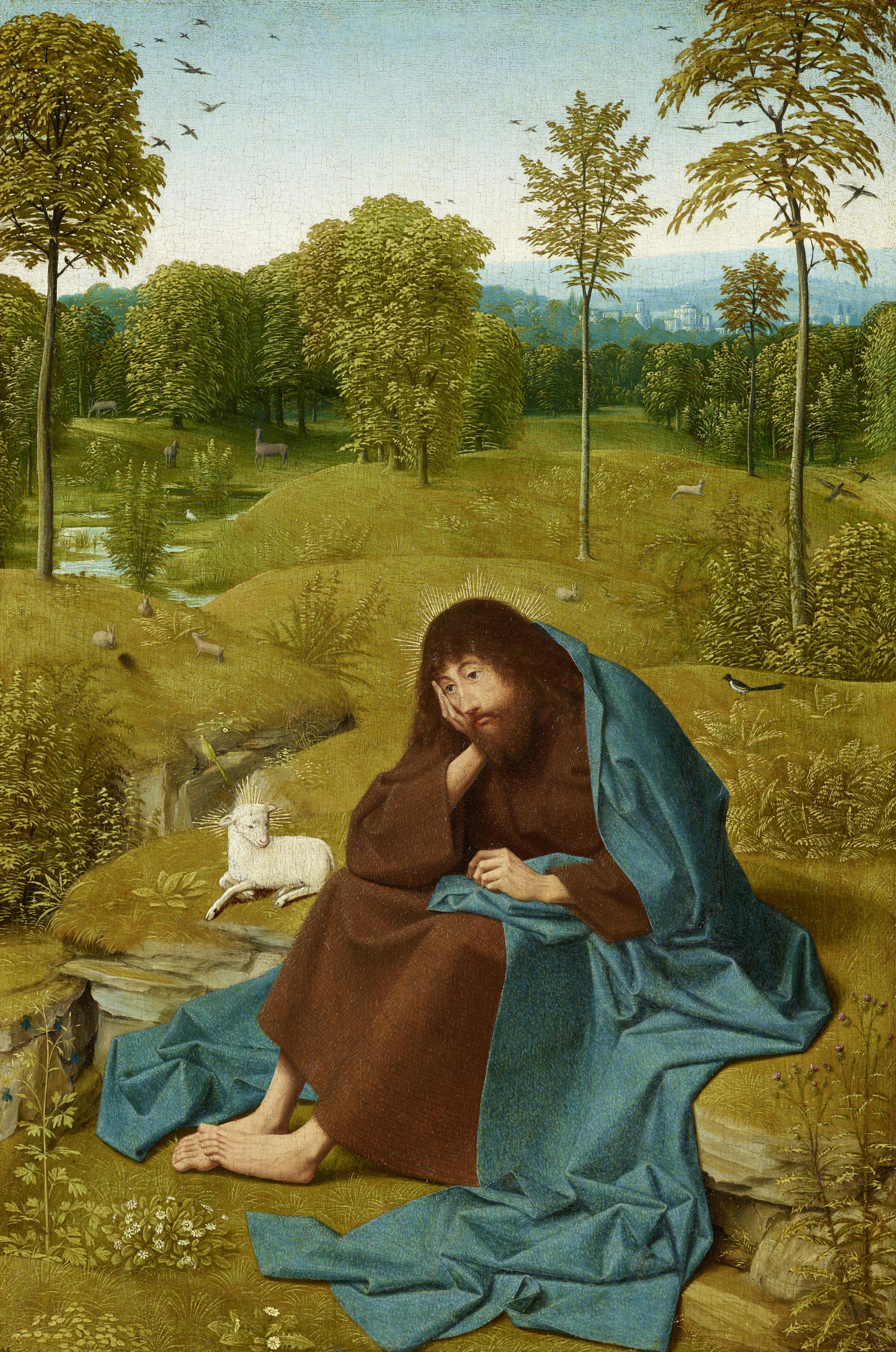
- John the Baptist in the Wilderness by Geertgen tot Sint Jans
- Book: Gospel of Matthew
- Christian Bible part: New Testament

Matthew 3:1 is the first verse of the third chapter of the Gospel of Matthew in the New Testament. This verse takes up the narrative some thirty years after Matthew 2:23, beginning the account of Jesus' ministry. This verse introduces the figure of John the Baptist.

== Content ==
In the King James Version of the Bible the text reads:

In those days came John the Baptist, preaching in the wilderness of Judaea,

The World English Bible translates the passage as:

In those days, John the Baptizer came, preaching in the wilderness of Judea, saying,

The Novum Testamentum Graece text is:

Ἐν δὲ ταῖς ἡμέραις ἐκείναις παραγίνεται Ἰωάνης ὁ βαπτιστὴς κηρύσσων ἐν τῇ ἐρήμῳ τῆς Ἰουδαίας,

For a collection of other versions see BibleHub Matthew 3:1. Other versions which refer to "John the Baptizer" include the Bible in Worldwide English (1996) and the Bible League International's Easy-to-Read Version (ERV, 2006).

== Analysis ==
Unlike the infancy narrative, this verse begins a section that is closely paralleled in Mark 1 and Luke 3. According to the theory of Markan Priority, both Matthew and Luke are rewritten versions of Mark. Keener notes that the hypothetical Q source also likely begins with John, explaining the overlap between Matthew and Luke in the non Markan-material, and why there is so little overlap in the nativity story.

The phrase "in those days" marks a substantial shift of time frame from the previous verse. Matthew nowhere indicates how long this break is, but Luke places it as some thirty years. Biblical commentator David Hill notes that "in those days" is frequently used as an indication that important events are taking place. To him the phrase thus more accurately means "in those crucial days". Other scholars, such as R. T. France and John Nolland, take a different view. They see the word those as a direct reference to Matthew 2:23 and thus treat the phrase as meaning "in those days that he lived in Nazareth".

This verse introduces the character of John the Baptist. Guthrie notes that John likely does not need much of an introduction to Matthew's largely Jewish readers, as he was a well-known figure at the time. Unlike Luke, Matthew gives none of John's early history: John is a much less important character in Matthew than in the other gospels, appearing only in a supporting role to Jesus. While Matthew and Luke refer to John the Baptist, Mark refers to him by the slightly different title "John the Baptizer". The word baptist is also somewhat controversial. To Anabaptists the correct translation is "John the Immerser".

=== The wilderness ===
The wilderness of Judea mentioned in this verse is generally taken to refer to the region of Judea sloping down from the highlands to the Dead Sea. This was an arid area not well suited to habitation. The term is occasionally translated as desert, but there was enough moisture to allow for pastoralism, so some consider this translation incorrect. According to Pliny this region was home to the Essenes; it was also home to Qumran, where the Dead Sea Scrolls were found. Many feel that John the Baptist was influenced by these groups. The phrase "in Judea" does not exist in the comparable verse in Mark, and is an addition by the author of Matthew. Matthew previously used the same qualifier for Bethlehem in Matthew 2:5 and 2:6. While John may have been in Judea in this period, it is clear he was on the other side of Jordan River at a later date when he was captured and executed by Herod Antipas who ruled Galilee and Perea. It could also be that Matthew is vague, and referring to the immediate east side of the Jordan as also being Judea.

The wilderness had other connotations to the early readers of Matthew. Guthrie notes that at this time the wilderness was considered much closer to God in contrast with the corruption of the cities. An exile to the wilderness also links to Exodus, and later prophets such as Hosea predicted that the Israelites would one day be forced back to the wilderness. It was thus widely accepted that new prophets and religious leaders would come out of the wilderness. Other scholars disagree and see the wilderness as desolate and forbidding. In Matthew 4:1 the wilderness will be introduced as the location where Jesus encounters the devil.

== Commentary from the Church Fathers ==
Pseudo-Chrysostom: The Sun as he approaches the horizon, and before he is yet visible, sends out his rays and makes the eastern sky to glow with light, that Aurora going before may herald the coming day. Thus the Lord at His birth in this earth, and before He shows Himself, enlightens John by the rays of His Spirit's teaching, that he might go before and announce the Saviour that was to come. Therefore, after having related the birth of Christ, before proceeding to His teaching and baptism, (wherein he received such testimony,) he first premises somewhat of the Baptist and forerunner of the Lord. In those days, &c.

Saint Remigius: In these words we have not only time, place, and person, respecting St. John, but also his office and employment. First the time, generally; In those days.

Augustine: Luke describes the time by the reigning sovereigns (Luke 3:1.) But Matthew must be understood to speak of a wider space of time by the phrase ‘those days’ than the fifteenth year of Tiberius. Having related Christ's return from Egypt, which must be placed in early boyhood or even infancy, to make it agree with what Luke has told of His being in the temple at twelve years old, he adds directly, In those days, not intending thereby only the days of His childhood, but all the days from His birth to the preaching of John.

Saint Remigius: The man is mentioned in the words came John, that is, showed himself, having abode so long in obscurity.

Chrysostom: But why must John thus go before Christ with a witness of deeds preaching Him? First; that we might hence learn Christ's dignity, that He also, as the Father has, has prophets, in the words of Zacharias, And thou, Child, shalt be called the Prophet of the Highest. (Luke 1:76.) Secondly; That the Jews might have no cause for offence; as He declared, John came neither eating nor drinking, and they say, He hath a devil. The Son of Man came eating and drinking, and they say, Behold a gluttonous man. (Luke 7:33.) It needeth moreover that the things concerning Christ should be told by some other first, and not by Himself; or what would the Jews have said, who after the witness of John made complaint, Thou bearest witness of thyself, thy witness is not true. (John 8:13.)

Saint Remigius: His office; the Baptist; in this he prepared the way of the Lord, for had not men been used to be baptized, they would have shunned Christ's baptism. His employment; Preaching;

Rabanus Maurus: For because Christ was to preach, as soon as it seemed the fit time, that is, about thirty years of age, he began by his preaching to make ready the way for the Lord.

Saint Remigius: The place; the desert of Judæa.

Maximus the Confessor: Where neither a noisy mob would interrupt his preaching, and whither no unbelieving hearer would retire; but those only would hear, who sought to his preaching from motives of divine worship.

Jerome: (In. Is. 40:3.) Consider how the salvation of God, and the glory of the Lord, is preached not in Jerusalem, but in the solitude of the Church, in the wilderness to multitudes.

Hilary of Poitiers: Or, he came to Judæa, desert by the absence of God, not of population, that the place of preaching might witness the few to whom the preaching was sent.

Glossa Ordinaria: The desert typically means a life removed from the temptations of the world, such as befits the penitent.

== See also ==
- Related Bible parts: Isaiah 40, Mark 1, Luke 3, John 1

== Sources ==
- Keener, Craig S. (1999). A commentary on the Gospel of Matthew. Wm. B. Eerdmans Publishing. ISBN 978-0-8028-3821-6.
- Nolland, John (2005). The Gospel of Matthew: a commentary on the Greek text. Wm. B. Eerdmans Publishing.

Preceded by Matthew 2:23	Gospel of Matthew; Chapter 3	Succeeded by Matthew 3:2
