= Matthew 3:6 =

- ← 3:5 3:7 →
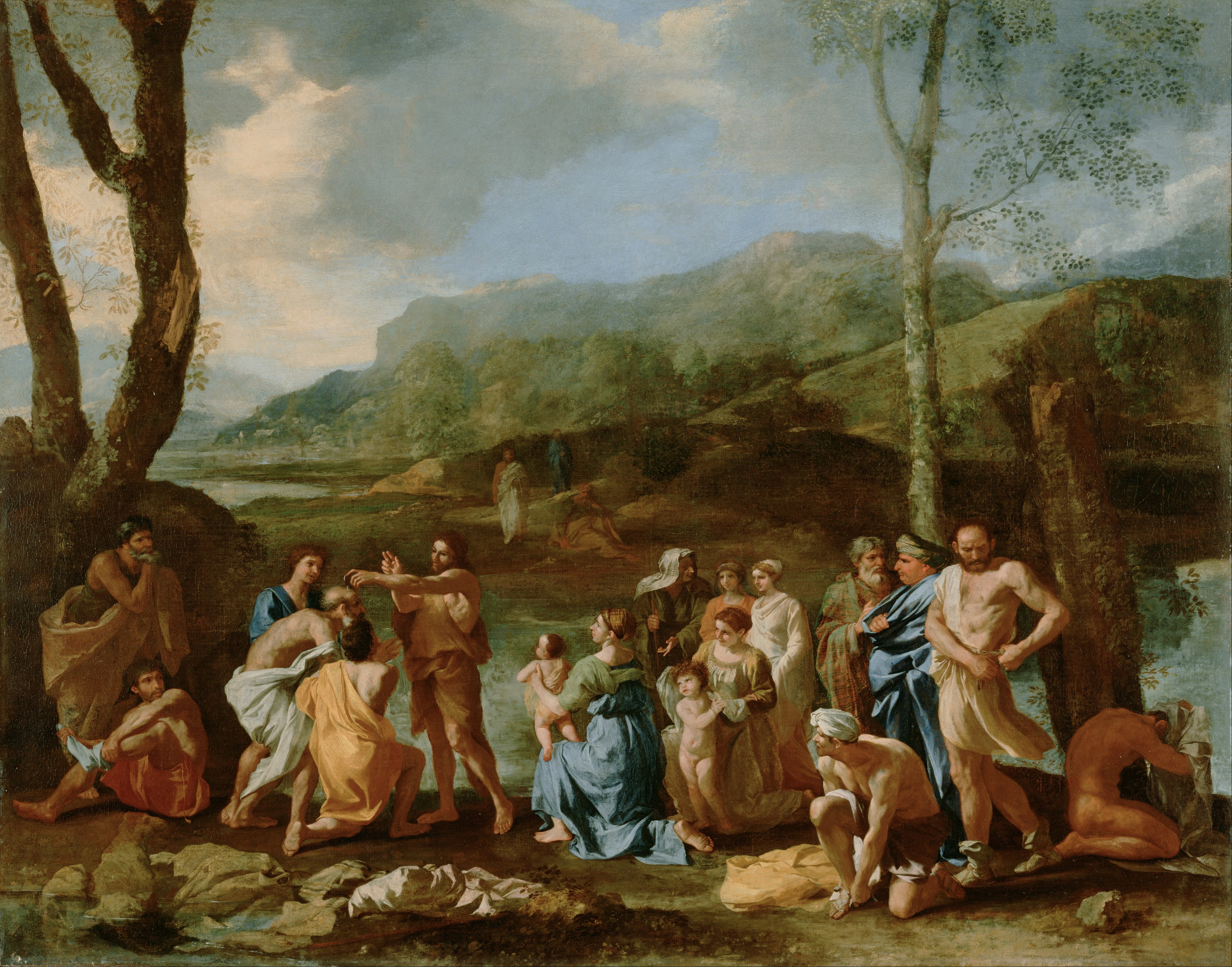
- Saint John Baptizing in the River Jordan. Painting by Nicolas Poussin (1594–1665).
- Book: Gospel of Matthew
- Christian Bible part: New Testament

Matthew 3:6 is the sixth verse of the third chapter of the Gospel of Matthew in the New Testament. The verse occurs in the section introducing John the Baptist with this verse describing his baptisms.

== Content ==
In the King James Version of the Bible the text reads:

And were baptized of him in
Jordan, confessing their sins.

The World English Bible translates the passage as:

They were baptized by him in
the Jordan, confessing their sins.

The 1881 Westcott-Hort Greek text is:

και εβαπτιζοντο εν τω ιορδανη ποταμω υπ αυτου
εξομολογουμενοι τας αμαρτιας αυτων

For a collection of other versions see BibleHub Matthew 3:6.

== Analysis ==
The use of the word baptism to describe what John is doing is controversial. Anabaptists assert that the only proper translation for the Greek verb baptizmo is immerse. They thus practice baptisms where the entire body is immersed in water, rather than just a sprinkling of water as is done in most other Christian churches. Most non-Baptist scholars do agree that John the Baptist was probably immersing those that came to see him, but they disagree that this is the only valid form of baptism.

France notes that while in Luke and Mark John's baptisms have the power to forgive sins in Matthew they are merely confessed. France argues that in the Gospel of Matthew forgiveness of sins only becomes possible after Jesus' resurrection, a theology not held by the other synoptics. The wording of this verse gives no guidance to the Protestant/Catholic dispute over whether the act of baptism cleanses one of sins, or if it merely symbolizes that a person has already been cleansed by God. Similarly the verse is unclear on what role confession plays in the process.

The origins of John's baptism ritual are much discussed amongst scholars. Hill notes that various forms of baptism were practiced throughout the Jewish world at this time, but that only those of John the Baptist and Qumran are eschatological. This has many scholars to propose a link between the Baptist and those who wrote the Dead Sea Scrolls. There were still important difference between the baptisms of the Essenes and that of John. In Qumran baptism was a part of a regular ritual for those already purified. In John and in Christianity it is a one time event with transformative powers.

== Commentary from the Church Fathers ==
Glossa Ordinaria: This baptism was only a forerunning of that to come, and did not forgive sins.

Saint Remigius: The baptism of John bare a figure of the catechumens. As children are only catechized that they may become meet for the sacrament of Baptism; so John baptized, that they who were thus baptized might afterwards by a holy life become worthy of coming to Christ's baptism. He baptized in Jordan, that the door of the Kingdom of Heaven might be there opened, where an entrance had been given to the children of Israel into the earthly kingdom of promise.

Pseudo-Chrysostom: Compared with the holiness of John, who is there that can think himself righteous? As a white garment if placed near snow would seem foul by the contrast; so compared with John every man would seem impure; therefore they confessed their sins. Confession of sin is the testimony of a conscience fearing God. And perfect fear takes away all shame. But there is seen the shame of confession where there is no fear of the judgment to come. But as shame itself is a heavy punishment, God therefore bids us confess our sins that we may suffer this shame as punishment; for that itself is a part of the judgment.

Rabanus Maurus: Rightly are they who are to be baptized said to go out to the Prophet; for unless one depart from sin, and renounce the pomp of the Devil, and the temptations of the world, he cannot receive a healing baptism. Rightly also in Jordan, which means their descent, because they descended from the pride of life to the humility of an honest confession. Thus early was an example given to them that are to be baptized of confessing their sins and professing amendment.

Preceded by Matthew 3:5	Gospel of Matthew; Chapter 3	Succeeded by Matthew 3:7
