= Matthew 3:2 =

- ← 3:1 3:3 →
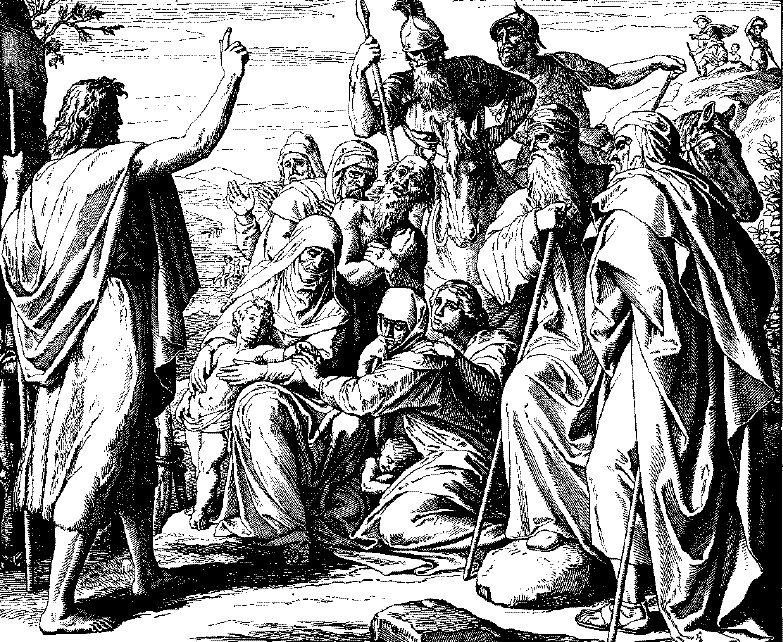
- An illustration of John the Baptist preaching about the Kingdom of Heaven, from the 1875 Young People's Illustrated Bible History
- Book: Gospel of Matthew
- Christian Bible part: New Testament

Matthew 3:2 is the second verse of the third chapter of the Gospel of Matthew in the New Testament. John the Baptist has been introduced in the first verse and this verse describes the message that he is preaching. Through John's message, Matthew introduces the "Kingdom of Heaven".

== Content ==
The text in critical Greek versions reads:

καὶ λέγων · Μετανοεῖτε, ἤγγικεν γὰρ ἡ βασιλεία τῶν οὐρανῶν.

The opening word καὶ (kai, "and") is omitted in Westcott and Hort's text.

In the King James Version of the Bible, the text reads: "And saying, Repent ye, for the kingdom of heaven is at hand."

The New International Version translates the passage as: and saying, "Repent, for the kingdom of heaven is near." (Note: For a collection of other versions see BibleHub: Matthew 3:2.)

== Analysis ==
Classical scholar Howard W. Clarke says that this is the first of twenty-nine references to the Kingdom of Heaven in the Gospel of Matthew. Luke and Mark tend to prefer the term "kingdom of God". Most scholars believe the two phrases are theologically identical. Robert Foster rejects this view. He finds the standard explanation hard to believe as Matthew uses the word God many other times and even uses the phrase Kingdom of God four times. Foster says that, for Matthew, the two concepts were different. He says that the word heaven had an important role in Matthew's theology and links the phrase especially to Father in Heaven, which Matthew frequently uses to refer to God. Foster says that the Kingdom of God represents the earthly domain that Jesus' opponents, such as the Pharisees thought they resided in, while the Kingdom of Heaven represents the truer spiritual domain of Jesus and his disciples.

When the last judgment failed to occur, Christian scholars gradually redefined the term to refer to a spiritual state within, or worked to justify a much delayed end time. This passage presents a difficulty in this later endeavour as the phrase translated as "at hand" or "is near" refers to an imminent event. Albright and Mann say that a better translation would state that the kingdom is "fast approaching". France sees it as even more immediate, saying that the phrase should be read as referring to "a state of affairs that is already beginning and demands immediate action".

According to France, the word translated as repent means "return to God". Albright and Mann state that at the time a general repentance was seen as necessary before the arrival of the messiah. Clarke notes that in the Vulgate of St. Jerome the word is translated as be penitent both here and in Matthew 4:17. This translation played a central role in the development of the Catholic doctrine of penance. With the increased knowledge of Greek in the Renaissance this translation began to be criticized, with Lorenzo Valla first pointing out the error. In Erasmus' 1516 translation and commentary he became the first to use repent rather than be penitent. It was from the doctrine of penance that the concept of indulgences had grown, and these new translations played an important role in Martin Luther and other Protestant's reappraisal of these practices. Today the word is universally translated as repent, leading some Protestant Christians to assume that the Catholic doctrine is grounded more in theology than in scripture.

Jesus also, in Matthew 4:17, preached "Repent, for the kingdom of heaven is at hand".

== Commentary from the Church Fathers ==
Augustine: Unless one repent him of his former life, he cannot begin a new life.

Hilary of Poitiers: He therefore preaches repentance when the Kingdom of Heaven approaches; by which we return from error, we escape from sin, and after shame for our faults, we make profession of forsaking them.

Pseudo-Chrysostom: In the very commencement he shows himself the messenger of a merciful Prince; he comes not with threats to the offender, but with offers of mercy. It is a custom with kings to proclaim a general pardon on the birth of a son, but first they send throughout their kingdom officers to exact severe fines. But God willing at the birth of His Son to give pardon of sins, first sends His officer proclaiming, Repent ye. O exaction which leaves none poor, but makes many rich! For even when we pay our just debt of righteousness we do God no service, but only gain our own salvation. Repentance cleanses the heart, enlightens the sense, and prepares the human soul for the reception of Christ, as he immediately adds, For the Kingdom of Heaven is at hand.

Jerome: John Baptist is the first to preach the Kingdom of Heaven, that the forerunner of the Lord may have this honourable privilege.

Chrysostom: And he preaches what the Jews had never heard, not even from the Prophets, Heaven, namely, and the Kingdom that is there, and of the kingdoms of the earth he says nothing. Thus by the novelty of those things of which he speaks, he gains their attention to Him whom he preaches.

Saint Remigius: The Kingdom of Heaven has a fourfold meaning. It is said, of Christ, as The Kingdom of God is within you. (Luke 17:21.) Of Holy Scripture, as, The Kingdom of God shall be taken from you, and shall be given to a nation bringing forth the fruits thereof. (Mat. 21:43.) Of the Holy Church, as, The Kingdom of Heaven is like unto ten virgins. Of the abode above, as, Many shall come from the East and the West, and shall sit down in the Kingdom of Heaven. (Mat. 8:11.) And all these significations may be here understood.

Glossa Ordinaria: The Kingdom of Heaven shall come nigh you; for if it approached not, none would be able to gain it; for weak and blind they had not the way, which was Christ.

== Notes ==
Preceded by Matthew 3:1	Gospel of Matthew; Chapter 3	Succeeded by Matthew 3:3
