= Matthew 3:13 =

- ← 3:12 3:14 →
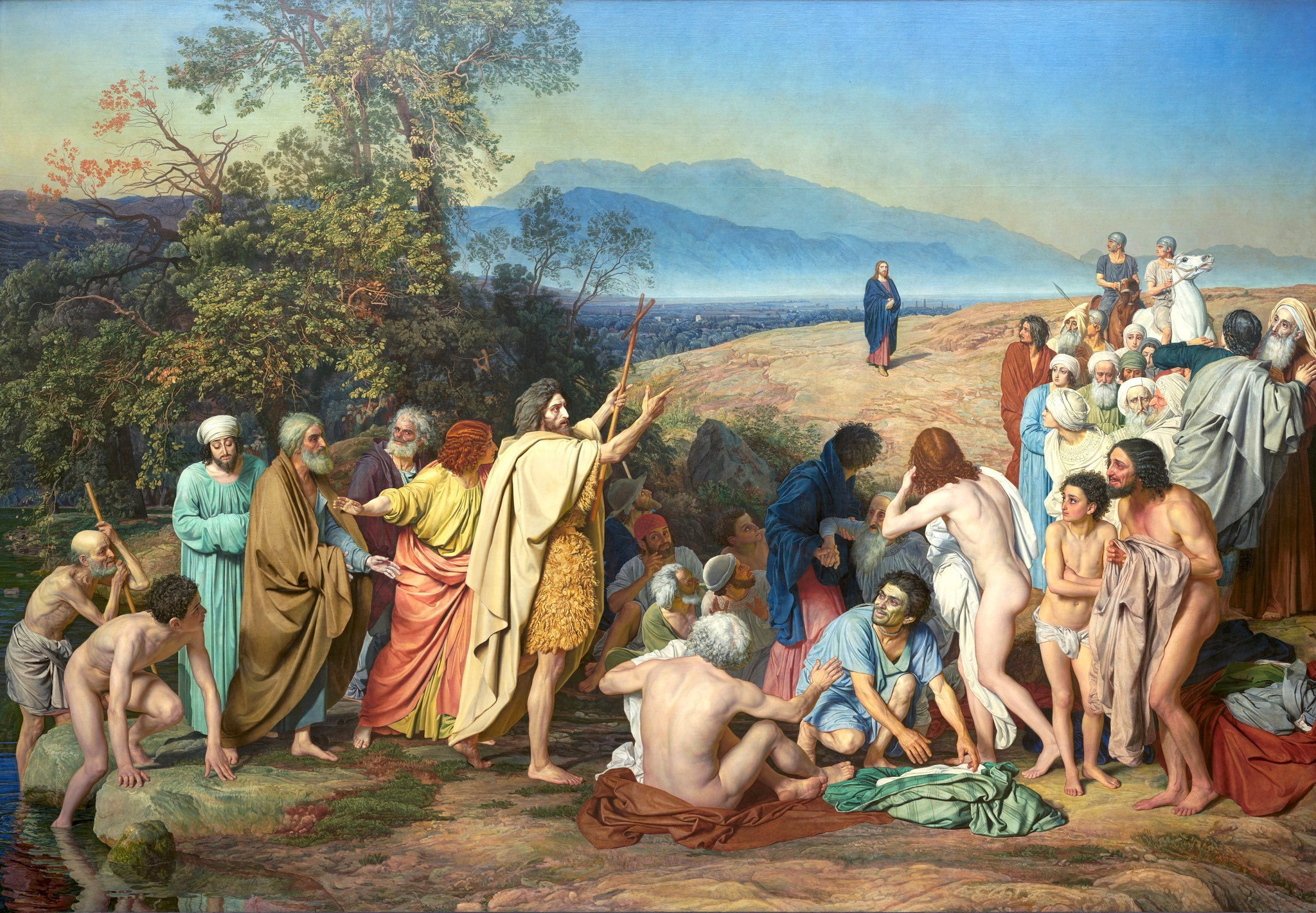
- Alexander Ivanov's The Appearance of Christ to the People showing Jesus arriving at the Jordan
- Book: Gospel of Matthew
- Christian Bible part: New Testament

Matthew 3:13 is the thirteenth verse of the third chapter of the Gospel of Matthew in the New Testament. The verse introduces the section describing the baptism of Jesus by John the Baptist.

== Content ==
In the King James Version of the Bible the text reads:

Then cometh Jesus from Galilee to
Jordan unto John, to be baptized of him.

The World English Bible translates the passage as:

Then Jesus came from Galilee to the
Jordan to John, to be baptized by him.

The 1881 Westcott-Hort Greek text is:

τοτε παραγινεται ο ιησους απο της γαλιλαιας επι τον ιορδανην
προς τον ιωαννην του βαπτισθηναι υπ αυτου

For a collection of other versions see BibleHub Matthew 3:13.

== Analysis ==
Jesus re-enters the narrative for the first time since Matthew 2:23. In that verse he moves to Nazareth in Galilee. In this verse he returns from that region to Judea. From Nazareth to the Al-Maghtas, the traditional site of the baptism of Jesus and the ministry of John the Baptist, is about 30 miles using modern Highway 71.

Howard Clarke notes that according to tradition Jesus was baptized in the Jordan River five miles south of the Allenby Bridge, today the site of a Greek Orthodox monastery dedicated to John the Baptist. The area is currently in a military zone and is closed to visitors. This verse differs considerably from the description of the same event in Luke 3:21. In Luke's account, Jesus is one of the crowd that has come to see John and it does not specify who baptized Jesus. Nor does the version at Mark 1:9 provide many details. Matthew's gospel is much more specific, describing Jesus seeking out John to be baptized.

German theologian Heinrich Meyer lists a number of reasons which, in his opinion, fail adequately to explain why Jesus came to be baptized by John:

"not in the personal feeling of sinfulness (B. Bauer, Strauss, Pécaut), or as the bearer of the guilt of others (Riggenbach, Krafft); not even because He, through His connection of responsibility with the unclean people, was unclean according to the Levitical law (Lange), or because He believed that He was obliged to regard the collective guilt of the nation as His guilt (Schenkel); just as little in order to separate Himself inwardly from the sins of the nation (Baumgarten), or make it certain that His Greek: σὰρξ ἀσθενείας, sarx astheneias, should not be opposed to the life of the Spirit (Hofrnann, Weissag. und Erfüll. II. p. 82), or because the meaning of the baptism is: the declaration that He is subjected to death for the human race (Ebrard); not even to bring in here the divine decision as to His Messiahship (Paulus), or to lay the foundation for the faith of others in Him, so far as baptism is a symbol of the regeneration of those who confess Him (Ammon, L. J. I. p. 268), or in order to honour the baptism of John by His example (Calvin, Kuinoel, Keim), or to bind Himself to the observance of the law (Hofmann, Krabbe, Osiander); or because He had to conduct Himself, before the descent of the Spirit, merely as an Israelite in general. The opinion also of Schleiermacher, that the baptism of Jesus was the symbolical beginning of His announcement of Himself, and, at the same time, a recognition of John’s mission, is foreign to the text".

Instead, Meyer suggests that "the true meaning appears from Matthew 3:15, namely, because Jesus was consciously certain that He must, agreeably to God’s will, subject Himself to the baptism of His forerunner, in order (Matthew 3:16-17) to receive the Messianic consecration; that is, the divine declaration that He was the Messiah".

According to David Hill, the relationship between Jesus and John the Baptist was one of the most important issues of first-century Christianity and Matthew is very specific in these matters.

== Commentary from the Church Fathers ==
Glossa Ordinaria: Christ having been proclaimed to the world by the preaching of His forerunner, now after long obscurity will manifest Himself to men.

Saint Remigius: In this verse is contained person, place, time, and office. Time, in the word Then.

Rabanus Maurus: That is, when He was thirty years old, showing that none should be ordained priest, or even to preach till He be of full age. Joseph at thirty years was made governor of Egypt; David began to reign, and Ezekiel his prophesying at the same age.

Chrysostom: Because after His baptism Christ was to put an end to the Law, He therefore came to be baptized at this age, that having so kept the Law, it might not be said that He cancelled it, because He could not observe it.

Pseudo-Chrysostom: Then, that is when John preached, that He might confirm his preaching, and Himself receive his witness. But as when the morning-star has risen, the sun does not wait for that star to set, but rising as it goes forward, gradually obscures its brightness; so Christ waited not for John to finish his course, but appeared while he yet taught.

Saint Remigius: The Persons are described in the words, came Jesus to John; that is, God to man, the Lord to His servant, the King to His soldier, the Light to the lamp. The Place, from Galilee to Jordan. Galilee means ‘transmigration.’ Whoso then will be baptized, must pass from vice to virtue, and humble himself in coming to baptism, for Jordan means ‘descent.’

Ambrose: Scripture tells of many wonders wrought at various times in this river; as that, among others, in the Psalms, Jordan, was driven backwards; (Ps. 114:3.) before the water was driven back, now sins are turned back in its current; as Elijah divided the waters of old, so Christ the Lord wrought in the same Jordan the separation of sin.

Saint Remigius: The office to be performed; that He might be baptized of him; not baptism to the remission of sins, but to leave the water sanctified for those after to be baptized.

Augustine: The Saviour willed to be baptized not that He might Himself be cleansed, but to cleanse the water for us. From the time that Himself was dipped in the water, from that time has He washed away all our sins in water. And let none wonder that water, itself corporeal substance, is said to be effectual to the purification of the soul; it is so effectual, reaching to and searching out the hidden recesses of the conscience. Subtle and penetrating in its own nature, made yet more so by Christ's blessing, it touches the hidden springs of life, the secret places of the soul, by virtue of its all-pervading dew. The course of blessing is even yet more penetrating than the flow of waters. Thus the blessing which like a spiritual river flows on from the Saviour's baptism, hath filled the basins of all pools, and the courses of all fountains.

Pseudo-Chrysostom: He comes to baptism, that He who has taken upon Him human nature, may be found to have fulfilled the whole mystery of that nature; not that He is Himself a sinner, but He has taken on Him a nature that is sinful. And therefore though He needed not baptism Himself, yet the carnal nature in others needed it.

Ambrose: Also like a wise master inculcating His doctrines as much by His own practice, as by word of mouth, He did that which He commanded all His disciples to do.

Augustine: He deigned to be baptized of John that the servants might see with what readiness they ought to run to the baptism of the Lord, when He did not refuse to be baptized of His servant.

Jerome: Also that by being Himself baptized, He might sanction the baptism of John.

Preceded by Matthew 3:12	Gospel of Matthew; Chapter 3	Succeeded by Matthew 3:14
