= Matthew 4:1 =

- ← 3:17 4:2 →
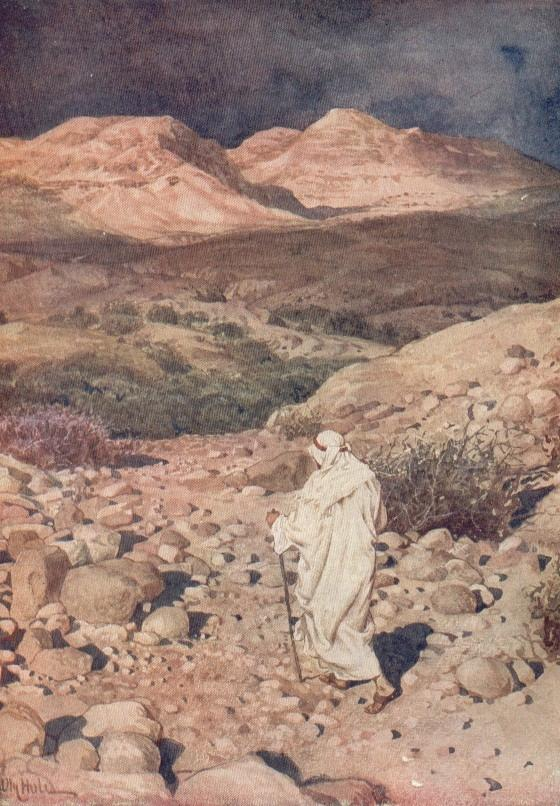
- Jesus entering the desert as imagined by William Hole, 1908
- Book: Gospel of Matthew
- Christian Bible part: New Testament

Matthew 4:1 is the first verse of the fourth chapter of the Gospel of Matthew in the New Testament. This verse opens the section in Matthew dealing with the temptation of Christ by Satan. Jesus has just been baptized by John the Baptist; in this verse he is led out into the wilderness.

== Content ==
In the King James Version of the Bible, the text reads:

Then was Jesus led up of the
Spirit into the wilderness
to be tempted of the devil.

The New International Version translates the passage as:

Then Jesus was led by the
Spirit into the desert to
be tempted by the devil.

The 1881 Westcott-Hort Greek text is:

τοτε [ο] ιησους ανηχθη εις την ερημον υπο του πνευματος
πειρασθηναι υπο του διαβολου

For a collection of other versions see BibleHub Matthew 4:1.

== Analysis ==
The verse makes clear that the Spirit, presumably the Holy Ghost prominently mentioned two verses before in Matthew 3:16, is the one who leads Jesus into the desert. France states that it is clear that while Satan's goals were his own, the testing of Jesus was ordained by God. France also feels that tempted is a poor translation. He argues that the devil was testing Jesus. Led up refers specifically to moving upwards geographically, likely linking to climbing from the river side of the Jordan to a location of higher latitude in the wilderness. Keener notes that the specific wording may also be a reference to God leading his people into the wilderness in Exodus.

There is no evidence of what specific wilderness area is being referred to, other than that it was at a higher level than the river. Jones reports that the wilderness mentioned here has since the 5th century been believed to be the rocky and uninhabited area between Jerusalem and Jericho. A spot on Mount Quarantania is traditionally the exact location, and a Greek Orthodox monastery exists on the spot today. Jones notes that this was Jesus meeting the devil on the devil's ground. The desert is seen as outside the bounds of society and as the home of demons. Other scholars, such as France, disagree arguing that the wilderness was considered pure and holy in contrast to the corrupting cities. France also notes that Matthew 12 has the waterless desert as a place unpleasant to demons. Heading into the desert to battle with demons became an important part of the monastic tradition in later centuries.

Gundry notes that some have read this reference to the wilderness as a comparison to Adam in the Garden of Eden. Implying that this time Jesus will not sin, and thus redeem humanity. Gundry rejects this idea and believes that nowhere does Matthew's text imply such a comparison. Rather Gundry supports the popular view that the reference to the wilderness is an allusion to the Israelites after the Exodus and specifically to Moses.

Matthew here uses the Greek word diabolos rather than the Hebrew satan used in Mark. Both words roughly translate as accuser, but it seems clear that both terms were understood as the name of a specific being at the time Matthew was writing. Matthew gives no details about the devil. The devil's status as a fallen angel (see Luke 10:18 & Revelation 12:9). The tail and pitchfork, and other embellishments are found nowhere in the Bible and were all products of later writings. In earlier parts of the Old Testament such as the Book of Job and 1 Chronicles the devil is portrayed as a lieutenant of God who works in a role that Albright and Mann describe as the "opposing council," testing humans on behalf of God. Over time, perhaps under the influence of Iranian dualism, Satan became the great antagonist and this was the view that was current by the time the gospels were written. However, this verse seems to somewhat echo Satan's early role as God's tester.

Augustine in his work on the Trinity, asks, "Why did He offer Himself to temptation?" He answers, "That He might be our mediator in vanquishing temptation not by aid only, but by example."

== Textual witnesses ==
Some early manuscripts containing the text of this verse are:

- Papyrus 101 (~ 250)
- Codex Vaticanus (325-350)
- Codex Sinaiticus (330-360)
- Codex Bezae (~400)
- Codex Washingtonianus (~400)
- Codex Ephraemi Rescriptus (~450)

== Commentary from the Church Fathers ==
Pseudo-Chrysostom: The Lord being baptized by John with water, is led by the Spirit into the wilderness to be baptized by the fire of temptation. ‘Then,’ i. e. when the voice of the Father had been given from heaven.

Chrysostom: (Hom. xiii.) Whoever thou art then that after thy baptism sufferest grievous trials, be not troubled thereat; for this thou receivedst arms, to fight, not to sit idle. God does not hold all trial from us; first, that we may feel that we are become stronger; secondly, that we may not be puffed up by the greatness of the gifts we have received; thirdly, that the Devil may have experience that we have entirely renounced him; fourthly, that by it we may be made stronger; fifthly, that we may receive a sign of the treasure entrusted to us; for the Devil would not come upon us to tempt us, did he not see us advanced to greater honours.

Hilary of Poitiers: The Devil's snares are chiefly spread for the sanctified, because a victory over the saints is more desired than over others.

Gregory the Great: (Hom. in. Ev. 16.1.) Some doubt what Spirit it was that led Jesus into the desert, for that it is said after, The Devil took him into the holy city. But true and without question agreeable to the context is the received opinion, that it was the Holy Spirit; that His own Spirit should lead Him thither where the evil spirit should find Him to try Him.

Augustine: (de Trin. iv. 13.) Why did He offer Himself to temptation? That He might be our mediator in vanquishing temptation not by aid only, but by example.

Pseudo-Chrysostom: He was led by the Holy Spirit, not as an inferior at the bidding of a greater. For we say led, not only of him who is constrained by a stronger than he, but also of him who is induced by reasonable persuasion; as Andrew found his brother Simon, and brought him to Jesus.

Jerome: Led, not against His will, or as a prisoner, but as by a desire for the conflict.

Pseudo-Chrysostom: The Devil comes against men to tempt them, but since He could not come against Christ, therefore Christ came against the Devil.

Gregory the Great: We should know that there are three modes of temptation; suggestion, delight, and consent; and we when we are tempted commonly fall into delight or consent, because being born of the sin of the flesh, we bear with us whence we afford strength for the contest; but God who incarnate in the Virgin's womb came into the world without sin, carried within Him nothing of a contrary nature. He could then be tempted by suggestion; but the delight of sin never gnawed His soul, and therefore all that temptation of the Devil was without not within Him.

Chrysostom: The Devil is wont to be most urgent with temptation, when he sees us solitary; thus it was in the beginning he tempted the woman when he found her without the man, and now too the occasion is offered to the Devil, by the Saviour's being led into the desert.

Glossa Ordinaria: (ap. Anselm.) This desert is that between Jerusalem and Jericho, where the robbers used to resort. It is called Hammaim, i. e. ‘of blood,’ from the bloodshed which these robbers caused there; hence the man was said (in the parable) to have fallen among robbers as he went down from Jerusalem to Jericho, bearing a figure of Adam, who was overcome by dæmons. It was therefore fit that the place where Christ overcame the Devil, should be the same in which the Devil in the parable overcomes man.

Pseudo-Chrysostom: Not Christ only is led into the desert by the Spirit, but also all the sons of God who have the Holy Spirit. For they are not content to sit idle, but the Holy Spirit stirs them to take up some great work, i. e. to go out into the desert where they shall meet with the Devil; for there is no unrighteousness wherewith the Devil is pleased. For all good is without the flesh and the world, because it is not according to the will of the flesh and the world. To such a desert then all the sons of God go out that they may be tempted. For example, if you are unmarried, the Holy Spirit has in that led you into the desert, that is, beyond the limits of the flesh and the world, that you may be tempted by lust. But he who is married is unmoved by such temptation. Let us learn that the sons of God are not tempted but when they have gone forth into the desert, but the children of the Devil whose life is in the flesh and the world are then overcome and obey; the good man, having a wife is content; the bad, though he have a wife is not therewith content, and so in all other things. The children of the Devil go not out to the Devil that they may be tempted. For what need that he should seek the strife who desires not victory? But the sons of God having more confidence and desirous of victory, go forth against him beyond the boundaries of the flesh. For this cause then Christ also went out to the Devil, that He might be tempted of him.

Preceded by Matthew 3:17	Gospel of Matthew; Chapter 4	Succeeded by Matthew 4:2
