= Matthew 4:3 =

- ← 4:2 4:4 →
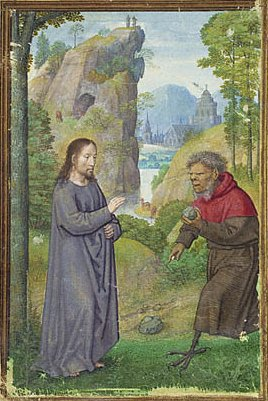
- 16th century master illuminator Simon Bening's depiction of the devil approaching Jesus with a stone to be turned into bread
- Book: Gospel of Matthew
- Christian Bible part: New Testament

Matthew 4:3 is the third verse of the fourth chapter of the Gospel of Matthew in the New Testament. This verse opens the section in Matthew dealing with the temptation of Christ by Satan. Jesus has been fasting for forty days and forty nights, and in this verse the devil gives Christ his first temptation by encouraging him to use his powers to get food.

== Content ==
In the King James Version of the Bible the text reads:

And when the tempter came to him,
he said, If thou be the Son of God,
command that these stones be made bread.

The World English Bible translates the passage as:

The tempter came and said to him,
"If you are the Son of God, command
that these stones become bread."

The 1881 Westcott-Hort Greek text is:

και προσελθων ο πειραζων ειπεν αυτω
ει υιος ει του θεου
ειπον ινα οι λιθοι ουτοι αρτοι γενωνται

For a collection of other versions see BibleHub Matthew 4:3.

== Analysis ==
This verse is very similar to Luke 4:3, but it is not found in Mark. Mark mentions that Jesus was "put to the test" but goes into no details about what those tests were. It is thus generally believed to have come from the Q document. One change is that Luke has "this stone" while Matthew has stones. Albright and Mann ascribe this to the writing style of the author of Matthew, noting that this gospel has a tendency to pluralize words that are singular in the other synoptics. Gundry notes that Jesus, as one person, would not need multiple loaves. He argues the pluralization is to link the verse to Matthew 3:9 in an attempt to link Satan to the Pharisees and Sadducees. Another difference is that Matthew calls Satan "the tempter" while Luke more directly refers to him as "the devil." Gundry feels this is for the same purpose as in Matthew 16:1, 19:3, and 22:18 the Pharisees and Sadducees are similarly presented as tempters.

Most scholars agree that the word if does not mean that Satan is doubting Jesus' status and the line should be read as "since you are the Son of God" not as "if you are really the Son of God." Gundry states that the devil has no interest in making Jesus doubt his sonship, and rather tries to use the exalted position to undermine him. This line is a direct reference to Matthew 3:17 and it is clear that Matthew is implying that Satan heard the announcement made after Jesus' baptism.

The wording is unclear on whether Satan is asking Jesus to miraculously transform the stones himself, or if he is asking Jesus to command God to do so.

The standard loaf of bread in this period was a round, flat loaf, and it seems likely that the stones being referred to in this verse are of a similar size and shape.

This is the second mention in Matthew of stones being transformed, with stones to people being threatened in Matthew 3:9. Nolland believes that this earlier reminder of God's power served to make this verse more plausible.

== Textual witnesses ==
Some early manuscripts containing the text of this verse are:

- Papyrus 101 (~ 250)
- Codex Vaticanus (325–350)
- Codex Sinaiticus (330–360)
- Codex Bezae (~400)
- Codex Washingtonianus (~400)
- Codex Ephraemi Rescriptus (~450)

== Commentary from the Church Fathers ==
Pseudo-Chrysostom: "The Devil who had begun to despair when he saw that Christ fasted forty days, now again began to hope when he saw that he was an hungred; and then the tempter came to him. If then you shall have fasted and after being tempted, say not, I have lost the fruit of my fast; for though it have not availed to hinder temptation, it will avail to hinder you from being overcome by temptation."

Gregory the Great: "If we observe the successive steps of the temptation, we shall be able to estimate by how much we are freed from temptation. The old enemy tempted the first man through his belly, when he persuaded him to eat of the forbidden fruit; through ambition when he said, Ye shall be as gods; through covetousness when he said, Knowing good and evil; for there is a covetousness not only of money, but of greatness, when a high estate above our measure is sought. By the same method in which he had overcome the first Adam, in that same was he overcome when he tempted the second Adam. He tempted through the belly when he said, Command that these stones become loaves; through ambition when he said, If thou be the Son of God, cast thyself down from hence; through covetousness of lofty condition in the words, All these things will I give thee."

Ambrose: "He begins with that which had once been the means of his victory, the palate; If thou be the Son of God, command that these stones become loaves. What means such a beginning as this, but that he knew that the Son of God was to come, yet believed not that He was come on account of His fleshly infirmity. His speech is in part that of an enquirer, in part that of a tempter; he professes to believe Him God, he strives to deceive Him as man."

Hilary of Poitiers: "And therefore in the temptation he makes a proposal of such a double kind by which His divinity would be made known by the miracle of the transformation, the weakness of the man deceived by the delight of food."

Jerome: "But thou art caught, O Enemy, in a dilemma. If these stones can be made bread at His word, your temptation is vain against one so mighty. If He cannot make them bread, your suspicions that this is the Son of God must be vain."

Pseudo-Chrysostom: "But as the Devil blinds all men, so is he now invisibly made blind by Christ. He found Him an hungred at the end of forty days, and knew not that He had continued through those forty without being hungry. When he suspected Him not to be the Son of God, he considered not that the mighty Champion can descend to things that be weak, but the weak cannot ascend to things that are high. We may more readily infer from His not being an hungred for so many days that He is God, than from His being an hungred after that time that He is man. But it may be said, Moses and Elias fasted forty days, and were men. But they hungred and endured, He for the space of forty days hungred not, but afterwards. To be hungry and yet refuse food is within the endurance of man; not be hungry belongs to the Divine nature only."

Preceded by Matthew 4:2	Gospel of Matthew; Chapter 4	Succeeded by Matthew 4:4
