= Matthew 4:2 =

- ← 4:1 4:3 →
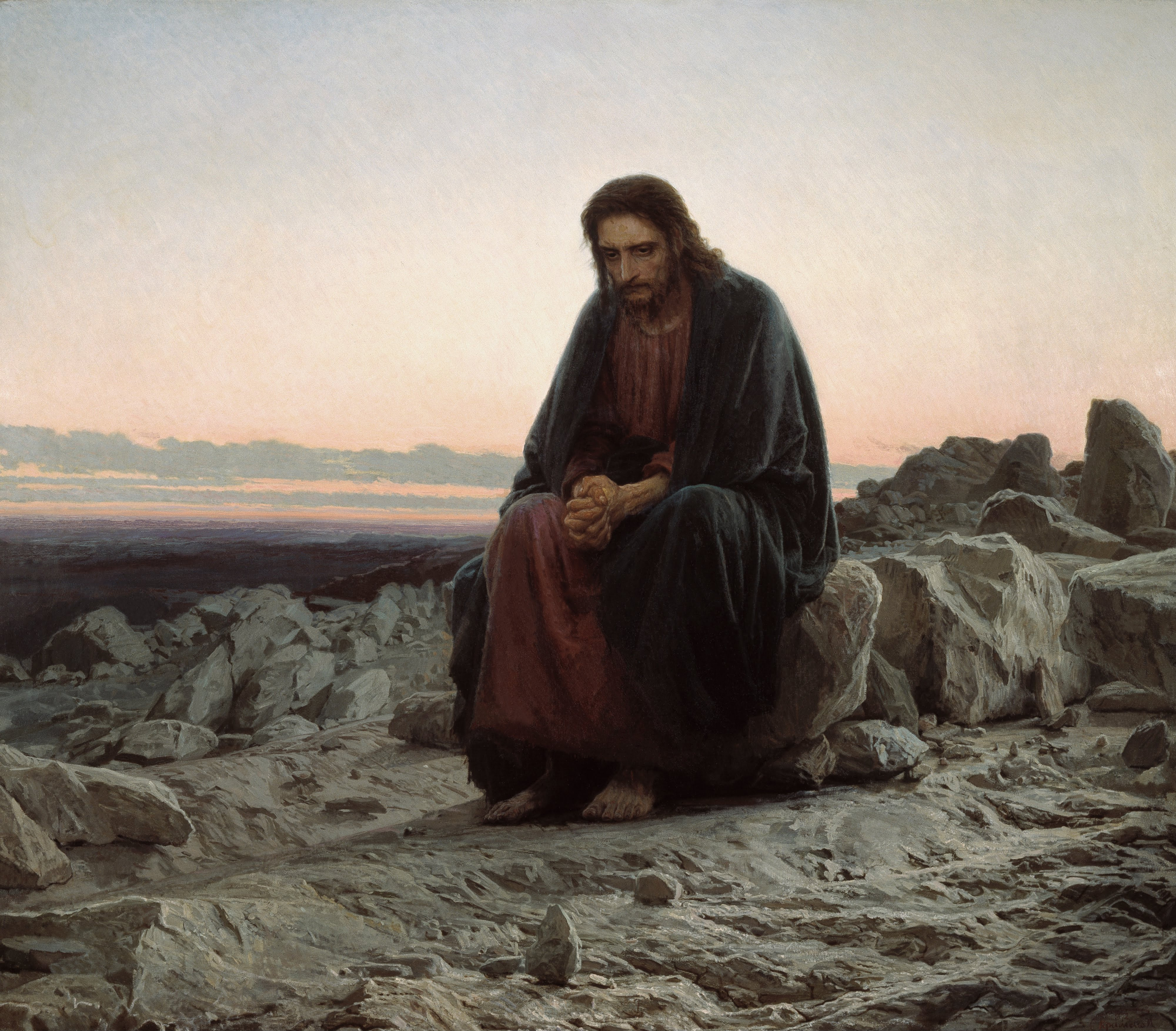
- Ivan Kramskoy's 1872 Christ in the Wilderness
- Book: Gospel of Matthew
- Christian Bible part: New Testament

Matthew 4:2 is the second verse of the fourth chapter of the Gospel of Matthew in the New Testament. This verse is just preceding the section in Matthew dealing with the temptation of Christ by Satan. Jesus has been led out into the wilderness, and in this verse he fasts.

== Content ==
In the King James Version of the Bible, the text reads:

And when he had fasted forty
days and forty nights, he
was afterward an hungred.

The World English Bible translates the passage as:

When he had fasted forty
days and forty nights, he
was hungry afterward.

The 1881 Westcott-Hort Greek text is:

και νηστευσας ημερας τεσσερακοντα
και νυκτας τεσσερακοντα υστερον
επεινασεν

For a collection of other versions see BibleHub Matthew 4:2.

== Analysis ==
Hill notes that traditionally fasting presaged a great spiritual struggle, as it does in this verse. The verse alludes to several Old Testament passages. Moses fasts for forty days and forty nights before writing the holy scripture, and Elijah in 1 Kings 19:8 travels for the same period without food. Matthew, unlike Luke, adds "and forty nights" more closely linking the passage to the Old Testament. Another important parallel is with the entire nation of Israel that spent forty years in the desert without much food after the Exodus. A popular theory is that the entire temptation narrative is meant to parallel the history of Israel. Clarke notes that at the time forty was less a specific number and more a general expression for any large figure.

France notes that fasting does not necessarily mean a complete abstinence from food and that Jesus may have been surviving on the sparse food that could be obtained in the desert. Mark does not mention this fasting and Luke implies it but does not use the word. Gundry notes that the author of Matthew seems to be a far more interested in this idea than the other evangelists, and in Matthew 6 again seems to present fasting as a model for good behaviour. This fasting became the model for the practice of Lent in the Roman Catholic and Eastern Orthodox churches, a ritual that lasts forty days, but is today a less than total abstinence. Protestants, in general, do not see this passage as a justification for Lent. Martin Luther felt the ritual was artificial, but useful in focusing the minds of the faithful. John Calvin felt the entire notion was silly and that if imitating Jesus was truly the path to salvation then believers should be striving to walk on water or turn water to wine.

== Textual witnesses ==
Some early manuscripts containing the text of this verse are:

- Papyrus 101 (~ 250)
- Codex Vaticanus (325-350)
- Codex Sinaiticus (330-360)
- Codex Bezae (~400)
- Codex Washingtonianus (~400)
- Codex Ephraemi Rescriptus (~450)

== Commentary from the Church Fathers ==
John Chrysostom: "But that you may learn how great a good is fasting, and what a mighty shield against the Devil, and that after baptism you ought to give attention to fasting and not to lusts, therefore Christ fasted, not Himself needing it, but teaching us by His example."

Pseudo-Chrysostom: "And to fix the measure of our quadragesimal fast, he fasted forty days and forty nights."

John Chrysostom: "But He exceeded not the measure of Moses and Elias, lest it should bring into doubt the reality of His assumption of the flesh."

Gregory the Great: "The Creator of all things took no food whatever during forty days. We also, at the season of Lent as much as in us lies afflict our flesh by abstinence. The number forty is preserved, because the virtue of the decalogue is fulfilled in the books of the holy Gospel; and ten taken four times amounts to forty. Or, because in this mortal body we consist of four elements by the delights of which we go against the Lord’s precepts received by the decalogue. And as we transgress the decalogue through the lusts of this flesh, it is fitting that we afflict the flesh forty-fold. Or, as by the Law we offer the tenth of our goods, so we strive to offer the tenth of our time. And from the first Sunday of Lent to the rejoicing of the paschal festival is a space of six weeks, or forty-two days, subtracting from which the six Sundays which are not kept there remain thirty-six. Now as the year consists of three hundred and sixty-five, by the affliction of these thirty-six we give the tenth of our year to God."

Augustine: "Otherwise; The sum of all wisdom is to be acquainted with the Creator and the creature. The Creator is the Trinity, Father, Son, and Holy Ghost; the creature is partly invisible,—as the soul to which we assign a threefold nature, (as in the command to love God with the whole heart, mind, and soul,)—partly visible as the body, which we divide into four elements; the hot, the cold, the liquid, the solid. The number ten then, which stands for the whole law of life, taken four times, that is, multiplied by that number which we assign for the body, because by the body the law is obeyed or disobeyed, makes the number forty. All the aliquot parts in this number, viz. 1, 2, 4, 5, 8, 10, 20, taken together make up the number 50. Hence the time of our sorrow and affliction is fixed at forty days; the state of blessed joy which shall be hereafter is figured in the quinquagesimal festival, i. e. the fifty days from Easter to Pentecost."

Augustine: "Not however because Christ fasted immediately after having received baptism, are we to suppose that He established a rule to be observed, that we should fast immediately after His baptism. But when the conflict with the tempter is sore, then we ought to fast, that the body may fulfil its warfare by chastisement, and the soul obtain victory by humiliation."

Pseudo-Chrysostom: "The Lord knew the thoughts of the Devil, that he sought to tempt Him; he had heard that Christ had been born into this world with the preaching of Angels, the witness of shepherds, the inquiry of the Magi, and the testimony of John. Thus the Lord proceeded against him, not as God, but as man, or rather both as God and man. For in forty days of fasting not to have been an hungred was not as man; to be ever an hungred was not as God. He was an hungred then that the God might not be certainly manifested, and so the hopes of the Devil in tempting Him be extinguished, and His own victory hindered."

Hilary of Poitiers: "He was an hungred, not during the forty days, but after them. Therefore when the Lord hungred, it was not that the effects of abstinence then first came upon Him, but that His humanity was left to its own strength. For the Devil was to be overcome, not by the God, but by the flesh. By this was figured, that after those forty days which He was to tarry on earth after His passion were accomplished, He should hunger for the salvation of man, at which time He carried back again to God His Father the expected gift, the humanity which He had taken on Him."

Preceded by Matthew 4:1	Gospel of Matthew; Chapter 4	Succeeded by Matthew 4:3
