= Uncial 071 =

- New Testament manuscript
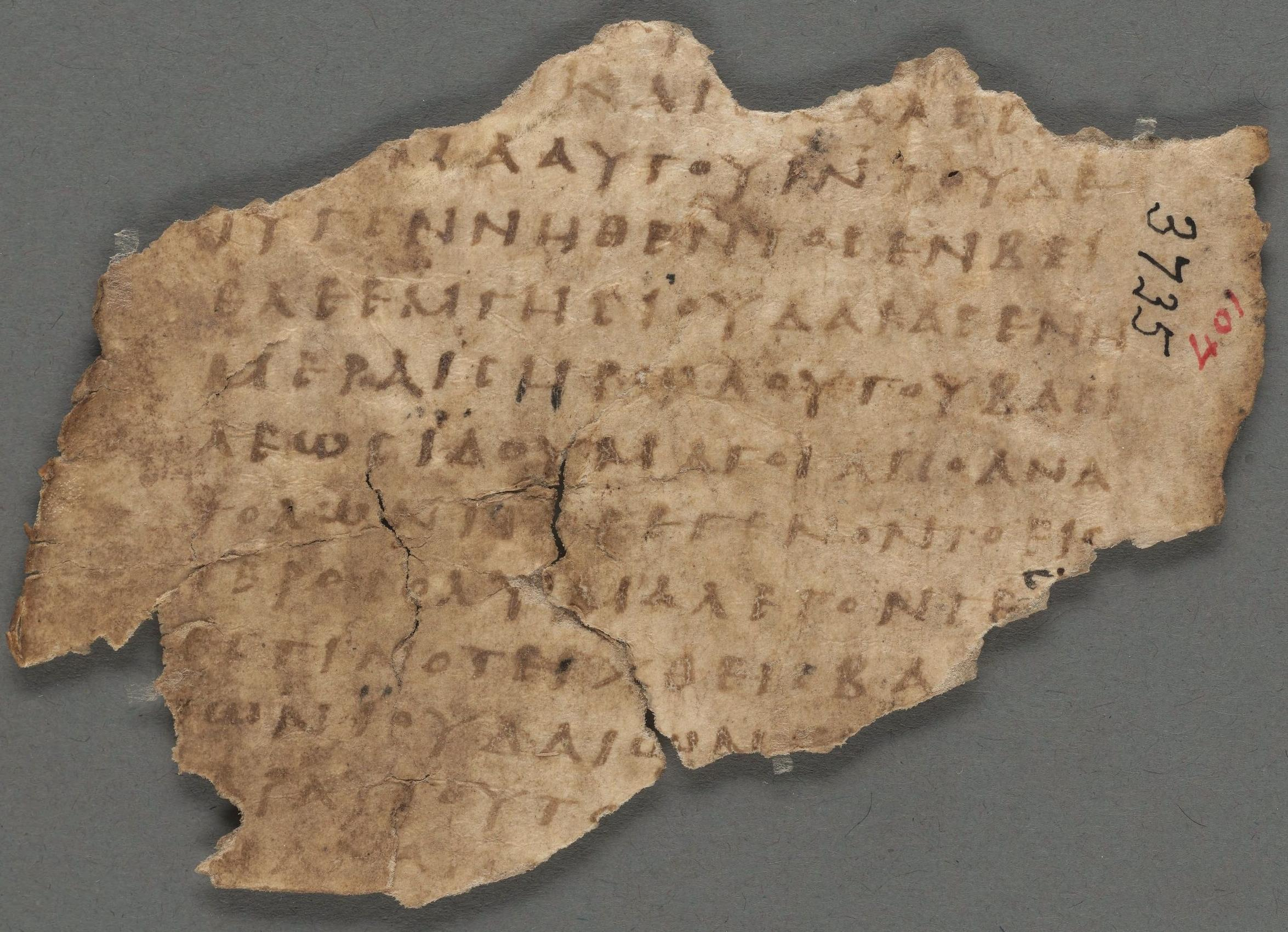
- Name: P. Oxy.III 0401
- Text: Matthew
- Date: 5th/6th century
- Script: Greek
- Now at: Harvard University
- Size: 7 x 9.5 cm
- Type: Alexandrian text-type
- Category: II

Uncial 071 (in the Gregory-Aland numbering), ε 015 (Soden), is a Greek uncial manuscript of the New Testament, dated paleographically to the 5th or 6th century. It came from Oxyrhynchus.

== Description ==
The codex contains a small part of the Gospel of Matthew 1:21-24; 1:25-2:2, on one parchment leaf (7 cm by 9.5 cm). It is written in one column per page, 13 lines per page.

Currently it is dated by the INTF to the 5th or 6th century.

Text

The Greek text of this codex is a representative of the Alexandrian text-type, in close relationship with Codex Sinaiticus, Vaticanus, and Dublinensis. Aland placed it in Category II.

Verso [απο τ]ων [αμ]αρ[τιων αυ των τουτο δε ολον [γεγονεν ινα πληρωθη το ρη[θεν υ πο κυ δια του προφητ[ου λε γοντος ιδου η [θ] παρθενος εν γαστρι εξει και τεξετε υν και καλεσουσι το ονο μα αυτου Εμμανουηλ ο [εσ]τιν μεθερμηνευομε [νον] μεθ ημων ο θς εγερ [θεις δε] Ι[ω]σηφ απο του υπ [νου εποιη]σεν ως προς [εταξεν αυτ]ω ο αγγελ[ος	Recto [νωσκεν] αυ[την εως ου ε [τεκεν υ]ν και εκαλεσε[ν το [ονο]μα αυτου Ιν του δε Ιυ γεννηθεντος εν βη θλεεμ της Ιουδαιας εν η μεραις Ηρωδου του βασι λεως ιδου μαγοι απο ανα τολων παραγενοντοεις Ιεροσολυμα λεγοντε [που εστιν ο τε[ι]χθεις βα[σιλευς των Ιουδαιων ει[δομεν γαρ αυτου το[ω αστερα εν [τ]η ανατο[λη]

Textual variants

Matt 1:24

εγερθεις (having been aroused) – א, B, C, Z, 071, f^{1}
διεγερθεις (having been awakened) – C^{3}, D, L, W, 087, f^{13}, mss of the Byzantine text-type

Matt 1:25

υἱὸν (a son) – א, B, Z, 071, f^{1}, f^{13}, 33
τὸν υἱὸν αὐτῆς τὸν πρωτότοκον (her firstborn son) – C, D, K, L (omit αὐτῆς), W, Δ, Π, 28, 565, 700, 892, 1009, 1010, 1071, 1079, 1195, 1216, 1230, 1241, 1242, 1365

Present location

The codex is now located in the Semitic Museum (3735) at Harvard University, Cambridge, Massachusetts.

== See also ==
- List of New Testament uncials
- Textual criticism
- Papyrus Oxyrhynchus
- Papyrus Oxyrhynchus 400
- Papyrus Oxyrhynchus 402
