= Papyrus Oxyrhynchus 403 =

Greek papyrus fragment

Papyrus Oxyrhynchus 403 (P. Oxy. 403 or P. Oxy. III 403) is a portion of the Apocalypse of Baruch, in Greek. It was discovered in Oxyrhynchus. The manuscript was written on papyrus, which originally formed a leaf from a book. It was written either in the late 4th century or in the 5th century AD. The text type represented in the papyrus suggests that it served as the source of the translation of the Apocalypse of Baruch into Syriac.

The papyrus is now located at the Virginia Theological Seminary in Alexandria, Virginia.

== Description ==
The measurements of the fragment are 14 by 11 cm.

== See also ==
- Oxyrhynchus Papyri
- Papyrus Oxyrhynchus 402
- Papyrus Oxyrhynchus 404
