= Papyrus Oxyrhynchus 404 =

Greek papyrus fragment

Papyrus Oxyrhynchus 404 (P. Oxy. 404 or P. Oxy. III 404) is three fragments of a leaf from a codex containing the Shepherd of Hermas, in Greek. It was discovered in Oxyrhynchus. The manuscript was written on papyrus. The portion of the Shepherd of Hermas attested in the manuscript is a portion of the ending that is otherwise lost in Greek, being attested complete only in translation into other languages such as Latin. This copy was written sometime in the late 3rd or early 4th century.

The papyrus is now located at the Bodleian Library at Oxford University.

== Description ==
The measurements of the third fragment are 7.8 by 5.3 cm.

== See also ==
- Oxyrhynchus Papyri
- Papyrus Oxyrhynchus 403
- Papyrus Oxyrhynchus 405
