= Papyrus 9 =

New Testament 3rd century papyrus fragment of the First Epistle of John of Luke in Greek

Papyrus 𝔓^{9}
- New Testament manuscript
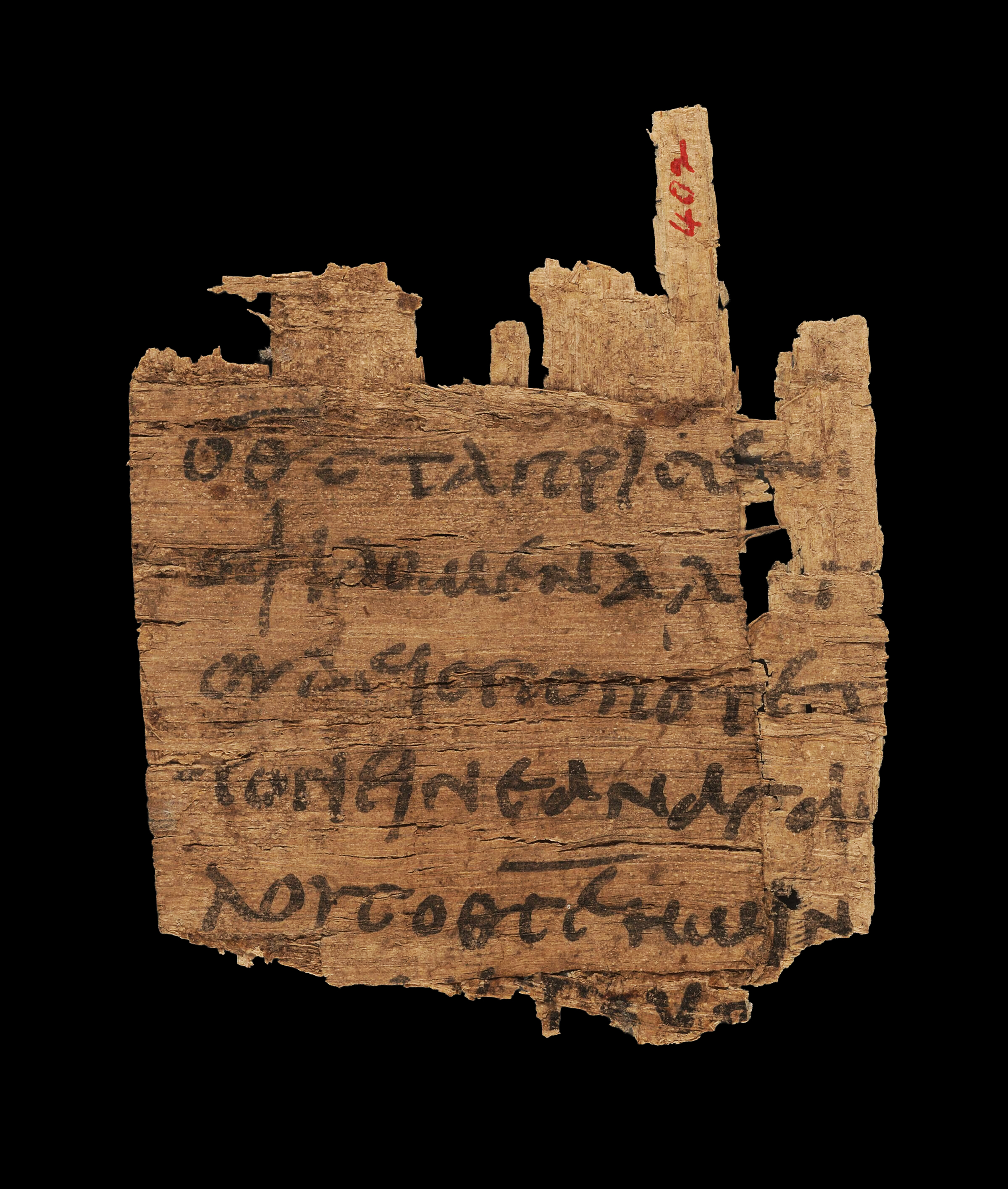
- 1 John 4:11-12
- Name: P. Oxy. 402
- Text: 1 John 4 †
- Date: 3rd century
- Script: Greek
- Found: Oxyrhynchus, Egypt
- Now at: Houghton Library
- Cite: Grenfell & A. S. Hunt, Oxyrhynchus Papyri III (1903), pp. 2-3
- Size: 8 x 5.2 c, [11 x 15]
- Type: Alexandrian text-type
- Category: I
- Hand: irregular

Papyrus 9 (in the Gregory-Aland numbering), signed by 𝔓^{9}, and named Oxyrhynchus papyri 402, is an early copy of the New Testament in Greek. It is a papyrus manuscript of the First Epistle of John, dating paleographically to the early 3rd century.

== Description ==
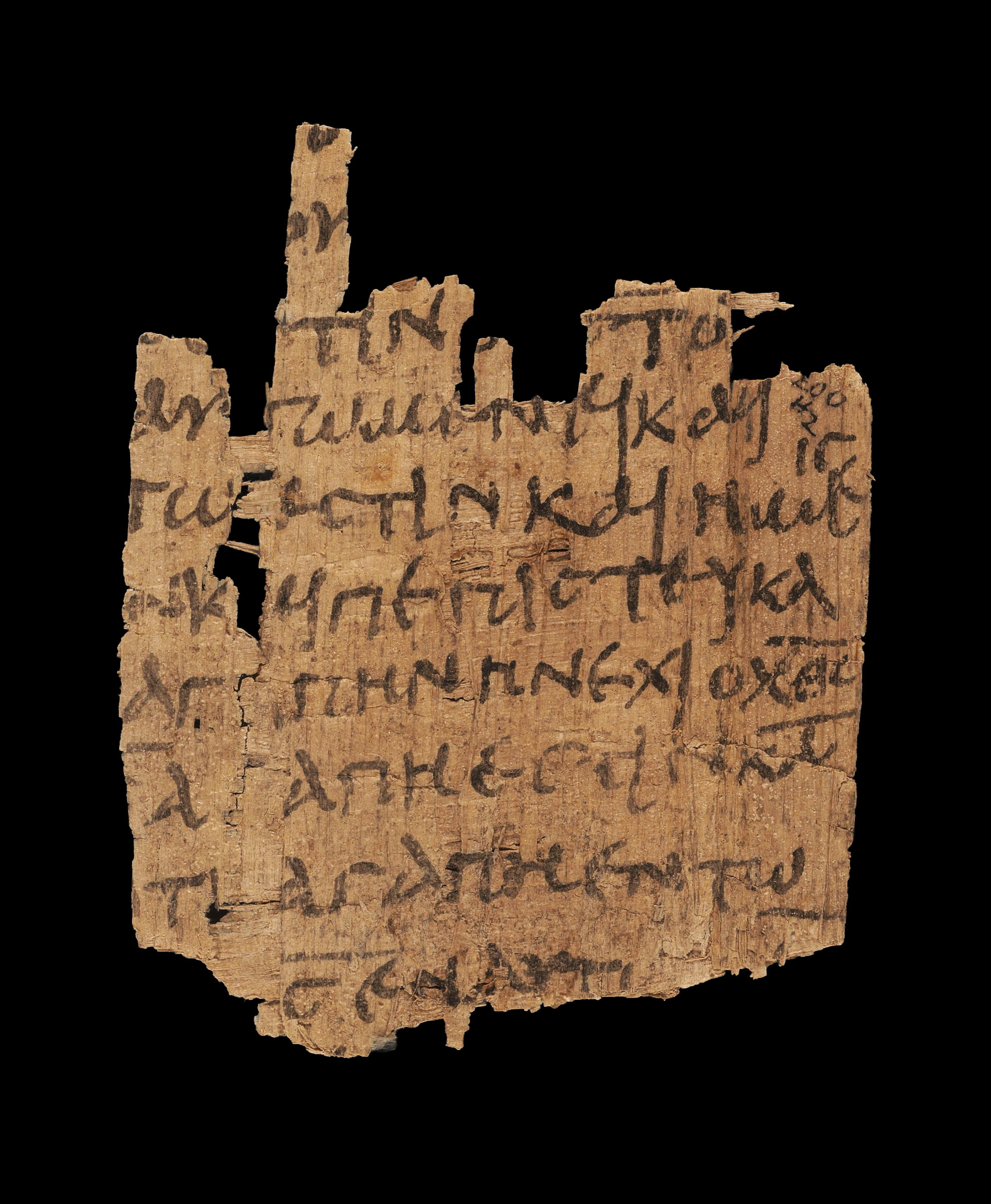
Verso 1 John 4:14–17

Papyrus 𝔓^{9} was discovered by Bernard Pyne Grenfell and Arthur Surridge Hunt in Oxyrhynchus, Egypt. Papyrus 𝔓^{9} is currently housed at the Houghton Library, Harvard University, Semitic Museum Inv. 3736, Cambridge (Massachusetts).

The surviving text is a fragment of one leaf containing verses 4:11–12,14–17, written in one column per page. The original codex had 16 lines per page. The text on the manuscript was written very carelessly, evidenced by the crude and irregular handwriting, and the manuscript contains some unintelligible spellings.

== Text ==
The Greek text of this codex is representative of the Alexandrian text-type. Aland placed it in Category I. The manuscript is too brief for certainty.

== See also ==
- 1 John 4
- List of New Testament papyri
- Oxyrhynchus papyri
- Papyrus 10
- Papyrus Oxyrhynchus 401
- Papyrus Oxyrhynchus 403
