= Papyrus Oxyrhynchus 405 =

Greek papyrus fragment

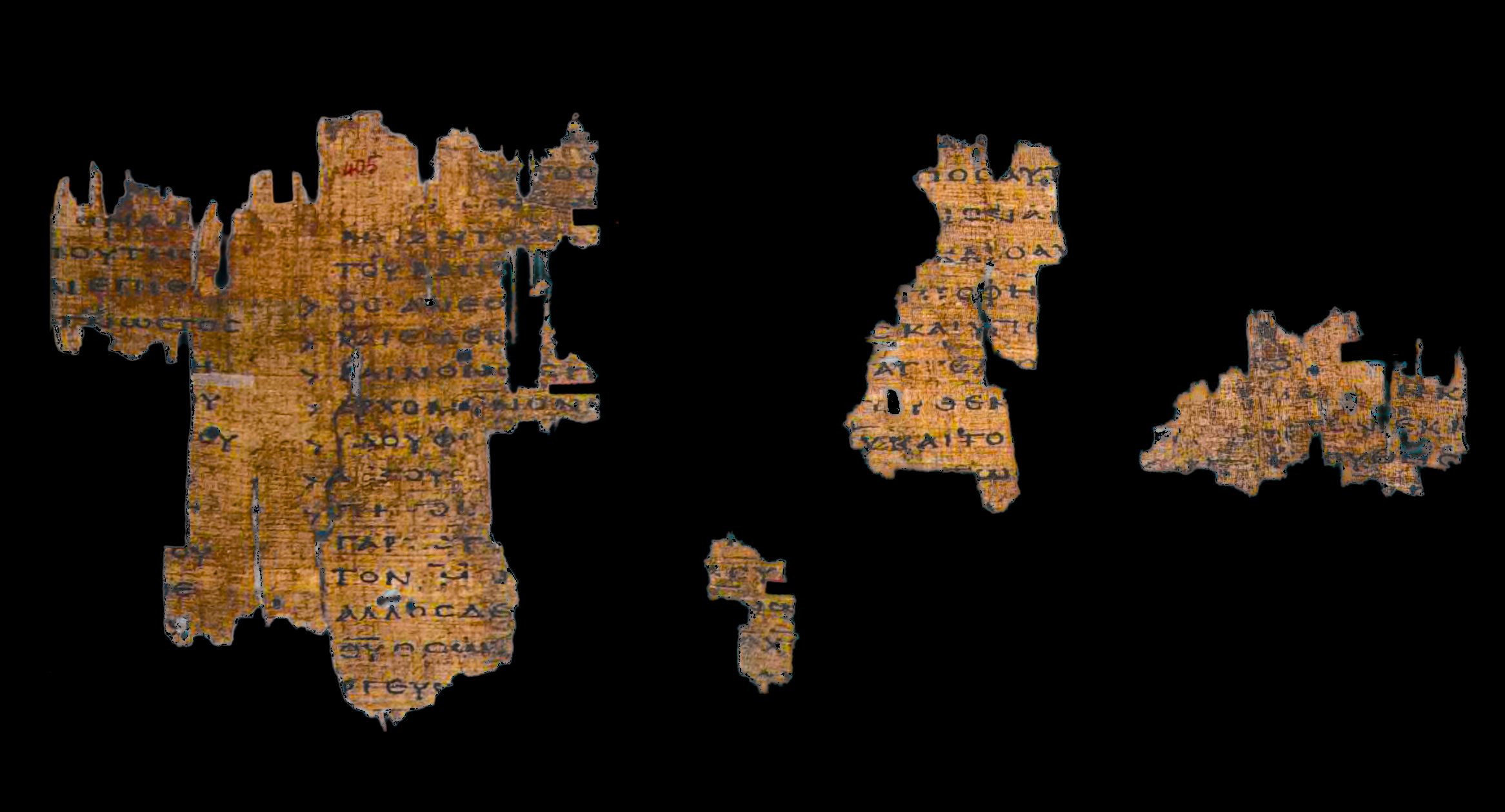
Papyrus Oxyrhynchus 405

Papyrus Oxyrhynchus 405 (P. Oxy. 405 or P. Oxy. III 405) is a fragment from a copy dating to c. 200 CE of the early Christian work Against Heresies, written by Irenaeus of Lyon around 180 CE.

It is one of the Oxyrhynchus Papyri, discovered by papyrologists Bernard Pyne Grenfell and Arthur Surridge Hunt at an ancient rubbish dump near Oxyrhynchus in Egypt around the turn of the 20th century. The papyrus fragment includes a quote from Matthew 3:16-17, and was the earliest witness to the text of the New Testament when it was discovered.

== See also ==
- List of Church Fathers
- Oxyrhynchus
- Oxyrhynchus Papyri
- Papyrus Oxyrhynchus 404

== Bibliography ==
- Hill, Charles Evan. "The Epistula Apostolorum: An Asian Tract from the Time of Polycarp," Journal of Early Christian Studies 7 (1999): 1-53.
