= First Epistle of John =

Book of the New Testament

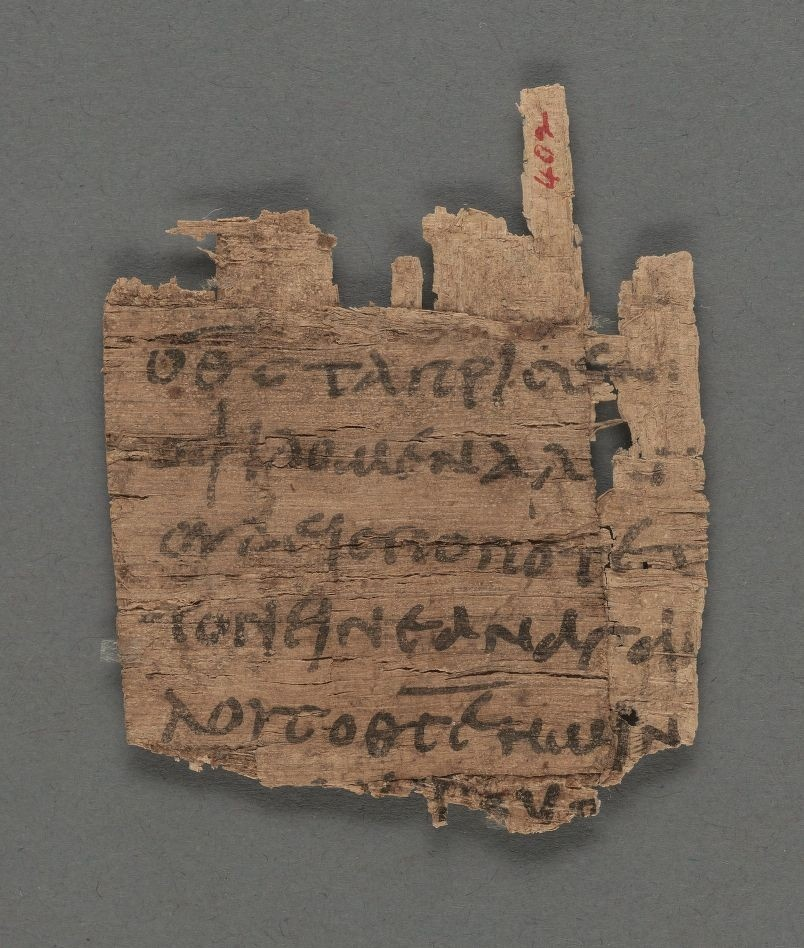
1 John 4:11–12 on Papyrus 9 (recto; c. AD 250)

The First Epistle of John (Note: The book is sometimes called the First Letter of John, or simply 1st John (which is also its most common form of abbreviation).) is the first of the Johannine epistles of the New Testament, and the fourth of the catholic epistles. There is no scholarly consensus as to the authorship of the Johannine works. Most scholars believe the three Johannine epistles have the same author, but there is no consensus if this was also the author of the Gospel of John.

This epistle was probably written in Ephesus between 95 and 110 AD. The author advises Christians on how to discern true teachers: by their ethics, their proclamation of Jesus in the flesh, and by their love. The original text was written in Koine Greek. The epistle is divided into five chapters.

== Content ==
The main themes of the epistle are love and fellowship with God. The author describes various tests by which readers may ascertain whether or not their communion with God is genuine, and teaches that the proof of spiritual regeneration is a life of active righteousness. It also distinguishes between the world (which is full of evil and under the dominion of Satan) and the children of God (who are set apart from the world).

== Style ==
The epistle is not written in the same form as the other biblical epistles, as it lacks an epistolary opening or conclusion. The epistle is written in a simple style, without syntactical flourishes, and makes frequent use of asyndeton, where related thoughts are placed next to one another without conjunctions. In contrast to the linear style used in the Pauline epistles, biblical scholar Ernest DeWitt Burton suggests that John's thought "moves in circles", forming a slowly advancing sequence of thought. This is similar to the parallel structure of Hebrew poetry, in which the second verse of a couplet often carries the same meaning as the first, although in this epistle the frequent recapitulations of already expressed ideas serve also to add to what has previously been said. In summary, the epistle may be said to exhibit a paraenetic style which is "marked by personal appeal, contrasts of right and wrong, true and false, and an occasional rhetorical question".

The text refers to the writer's audience several times as "little children" (Ancient Greek: Τεκνία, teknia). This affectionate diminutive appears seven times in the letter, once as "my little children" (1 John 2:1), and the phrase also appears in John 13:33. Paul also uses the phrase "my little children" when addressing the Galatian churches in Galatians 4:19.

Some scholars have proposed the idea that the epistle is really John's commentary on a selection of traditional parallel couplets. While this theory, first propounded by Ernst von Dobschütz and Rudolf Bultmann, is not universally accepted, Amos Wilder writes that, "It is at least clear that there are considerable and sometimes continuous elements in the epistle whose style distinguishes them from that of the author both with respect to poetic structure and syntactic usage."

== Authorship ==
The epistle is traditionally held to have been composed by John the Evangelist, at Ephesus, when the writer was in advanced age. The author claims to write as a witness to the ministry of Jesus in the prologue and 4:14, an claim reminiscent of those in the Gospel of John (1:14, 19:35, 21:24). The epistle's content, language and conceptual style are very similar to the Gospel of John, 2 John, and 3 John. Thus, at the end of the 19th century scholar Ernest DeWitt Burton wrote that there could be "no reasonable doubt" that 1 John and the gospel were written by the same author. Most scholars today believe the three Johannine epistles have the same author.

Beginning in the 20th century, however, critical scholars like Heinrich Julius Holtzmann and C. H. Dodd identified the Gospel of John and 1 John as works of different authors. Certain linguistic features of the two texts support this view. For instance, 1 John often uses a demonstrative pronoun at the beginning of a sentence, then a particle or conjunction, followed by an explanation or definition of the demonstrative at the end of the sentence—a stylistic technique which is not used in the gospel. The author of the epistle also "uses the conditional sentence in a variety of rhetorical figures which are unknown to the gospel". This indicates, at the very least, the linguistic characteristics changed over time. Most scholars agree for a direct literary borrowing between the Gospel and 1 John.

The idea of a Johannine community has been increasingly challenged, and there is no consensus among scholars today.

The author of the First Epistle is sometimes termed John the Evangelist. Christians have traditionally identified him with John the Apostle, John of Patmos, and John the Presbyter, although there is no consensus on how many of these may actually be the same individual. Most critical scholars conclude that John the Apostle wrote none of these works.

== Purpose ==
The New Jerome Biblical Commentary suggests that while the Fourth Gospel addresses challenges by Judaism and others to the community, the three Johannine epistles "describe the fracturing of the Johannine community itself", though there has been increasing skepticism of the existence of the Johannine community in 21st century scholarship.

The author wrote the epistle so that the joy of his audience would "be full" (1:4); that they would "not practice sin" (2:1); that they would not be deceived by false teachers (2:26); and that "you who believe in the name of the Son of God... may continue to know that you have eternal life" (5:13). There are two main approaches to understanding the overall purpose of the letter, tests of life (popularized by Robert Law) and tests of fellowship (popularized by John Mitchell and Zane Hodges). Whereas the Gospel of John was written for unbelievers (John 20:31), this epistle was written to those who were already believers (5:13). Ernest DeWitt Burton found it likely that its audience was largely gentile rather than Jewish, since it contains few Old Testament quotations or distinctly Jewish forms of expression.

The epistle also partakes of the debate over Jesus's nature: the debate over "flesh" or the incarnation. In early Christianity, some advocated for docetism, a view that Christ's figure on earth had been purely illusionary (i.e. not in flesh). Most notably, the group that would eventually become the Gnostics were docetic. 1 John fiercely denounces this belief in favor of the view that Jesus had a real appearance "in the flesh" on Earth. Chapter 4 writes that "every spirit that confesses that Jesus Christ has come in the flesh is from God" (NRSV), and other passages say that Jesus shed blood, and if he could not shed blood then his death was meaningless. Chapter 2 also includes a passage that refers to a group of proto-Gnostics: a group that was once with the church but have since left it and deny that the human Jesus was also the spiritual Christ. The author denounces these secessionists as "antichrists". The introduction possibly also addresses the issue, especially if the identification of the author as John, or a pseudepigraphic claim to have been a disciple, is assumed: Chapter 1 writes of having evidence of the truth via eyes and touch. The author may thus be claiming to have known the physical Jesus personally and is emphasizing his physicality as a flesh-and-blood person rather than a spirit or phantasm.

== Reception history ==
Polycarp demonstrates familiarity with the First Epistle of John and possibly the Second Epistle of John. Eusebius noted that Papias of Hierapolis incorporated testimonies from 1 John in his works.

== Surviving early manuscripts ==
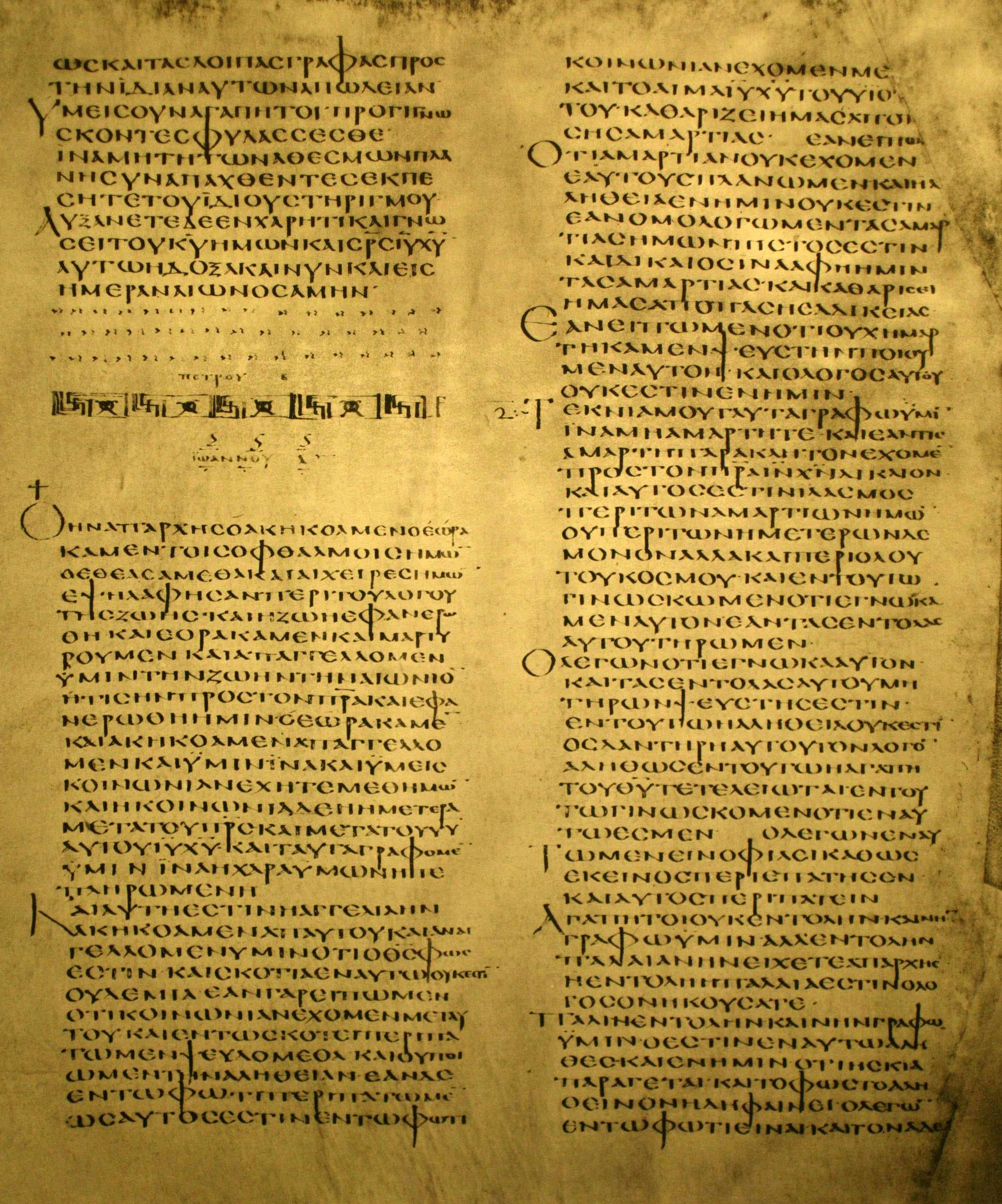
The end part of the Second Epistle of Peter (3:16–18) and the beginning of the First Epistle of John (1:1–2:9) on the same page of Codex Alexandrinus (AD 400–440)

The earliest written versions of the epistle have been lost; some of the earliest surviving manuscripts include:

In Greek

- Codex Vaticanus (AD 300–325)
- Codex Sinaiticus (330–360)
- Codex Alexandrinus (400–440)
- Codex Ephraemi Rescriptus (c. 450; fragmentary)
- Papyrus 74 (7th century; fragmentary)

In Latin

- León palimpsest (7th century; extant verses 1 John 1:5–5:21, including the text of the Comma Johanneum (1 John 5:7).

The Muratorian fragment, dated to AD 170, cites chapter 1, verses 1–3 within a discussion of the Gospel of John. Papyrus 9, dating from the 3rd century, has surviving parts of chapter 4, verses 11–12 and 14–17.

Different versions of the Greek manuscript have different wording for some verses.

== Prologue ==
Verses 1–4 of the first chapter constitute a prologue or introduction concerning the Incarnate Word. Like the Prologue to John's Gospel, this introduction tells us that what the author proposes to write about is the Word which is the Life. Anglican commentator Alfred Plummer notes that "the similarity to the opening of the Gospel is manifest", but with a significant difference, in that the gospel refers to the existence of the Ancient Greek: λόγος, lógos, word, before the creation, whereas here the point is that the word existed before the incarnation.

== Johannine Comma ==
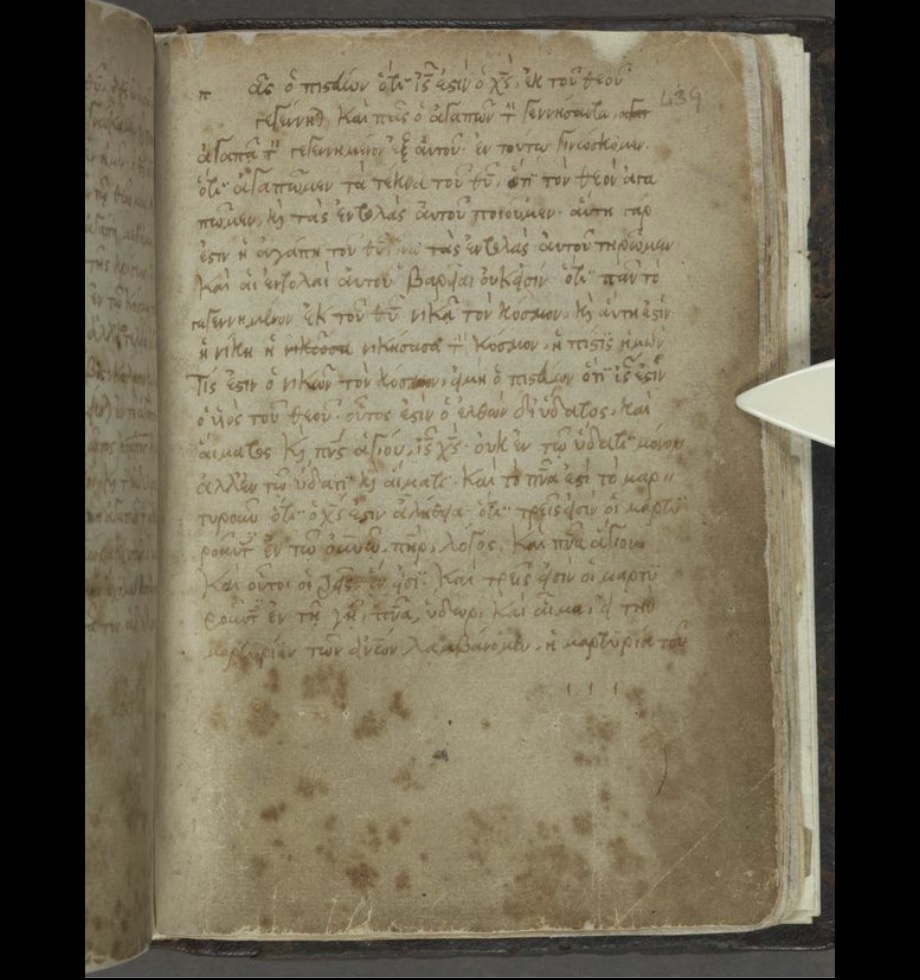
Codex Montfortianus (1520) page 434 recto with 1 John 5 Comma Johanneum.

A Trinitarian gloss (marginal note) known as the Johannine Comma, added to Latin translations of the epistle in the 4th century, was interpolated (added to the main text) within 1 John 5:7–8 over the1 John 5:7–8 over the course of the Middle Ages. Although no Greek manuscripts before the 15th century include the passage, Erasmus added it to later editions of his edition of the New Testament, beginning in 1522. Bibles translated from his edition integrate the passage, including the King James Version (1611), which renders it as follows (in italics):

^{7}For there are three that beare record in heaven, the Father, the Word, and the Holy Ghost: and these three are one. ^{8}And there are three that beare witnesse in earth, the Spirit, and the Water, and the Blood, and these three agree in one.

Translations made since the 18th century and based on a critical edition do not include this text, or include it as a footnote. Because the addition supports the doctrine of trinitarianism, it featured in Protestant and Catholic debates on this subject in the early modern period.

== Final verse ==
Little children, keep yourselves from idols. Amen.

Plummer suggests that here, "as at the end of [John's] Gospel and the Second Epistle, 'Amen' is the addition of a copyist". The Textus Receptus version includes "Ἀμήν", Amen, at the end but critical editions do not.

== "To the Parthians" ==
Around 415, Augustine of Hippo wrote a commentary in Latin On the Epistle of John to the Parthians (in Latin, ad Parthos), in which he identifies the addressees of John's letter as Parthians. It has occasionally been suggested that this refers to a community of converts in the Jewish community of Babylonia. Around 730, Bede wrote that Athanasius of Alexandria had also believed in a Parthian destination for 1 John. This tradition, however, is known only from Latin sources. (Three late Greek manuscripts of 2 John label it "to the Parthians".) On balance, it is likely that John's first letter was written for the Ephesian church and that the Parthian label results from a misreading or misunderstanding.

== Uses ==
=== Music ===
"1 John 4:16" is a song title in the album "The Life of the World to Come", inspired by this verse, which was released by the American band The Mountain Goats in 2009.

== See also ==
- If the world hates you
- John the Apostle
- John the Evangelist

== Notes ==
First Epistle of John General Epistle
Preceded by Second Peter	New Testament; Books of the Bible	Succeeded by Second John
