= Matthew 3:14 =

- ← 3:13 3:15 →
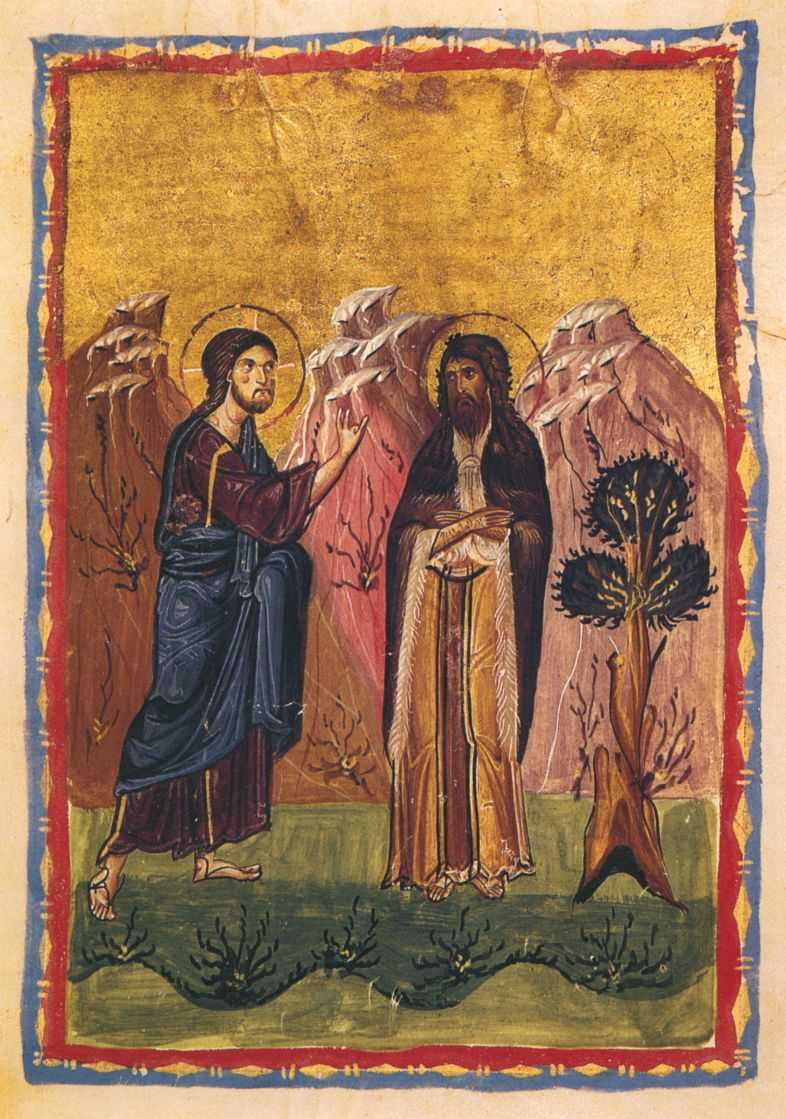
- Jesus meets John the Baptist (15th-century painting).
- Book: Gospel of Matthew
- Christian Bible part: New Testament

Matthew 3:14 is the fourteenth verse of the third chapter of the Gospel of Matthew in the New Testament. Jesus has come to John the Baptist to be baptized, but in this verse John balks at doing so.

== Content ==
In the King James Version of the Bible the text reads:

But John tried to deter him saying, "I need to be baptised by you, and do you come to me?"

The World English Bible translates the passage as:

But John prohibited Him, saying "I need to be baptised by you, and do you come to me?"

The 1881 Westcott-Hort Greek text is:

ο δε διεκωλυεν αυτον λεγων
εγω χρειαν εχω υπο σου βαπτισθηναι και συ ερχη προς με

For a collection of other versions see BibleHub Matthew 3:14.

== Analysis ==
Gundry notes that this section does not appear in Luke or Mark and concludes that it is thus likely original to Matthew. In the environment the author of Matthew is presumed to have been writing in there would still have been many followers of John the Baptist who felt he was equal or superior to Jesus. Matthew is thus very careful to specify the relationship between the two. Albright and Mann state that this verse and the next are often seen as an embarrassed attempt to justify the messiah being baptized by a mere mortal.

The verse does not specify why exactly John believes he is the one to be baptized. Based on Matthew 3:11 most scholars feel it is largely an issue of precedence. However, according to Hill the Gospel of the Nazarenes, adds a clarification to this section stating that it was because of Jesus' sinlessness that John felt he was the one who should be baptized. In John the order of events is distinct, and the Baptist only recognizes Jesus' nature after the baptism.

John Chrysostom writes concerning this verse, "Since John’s baptism was for repentance, and therefore showed the presence of sin, that none might suppose Christ’s coming to the Jordan to have been on this account, John cried to Him, I have need to be baptized of You, and do You come to me? As if he had said, 'That You should baptize me, there is a good reason, that I may be made righteous and worthy of heaven; but that I should baptize You, what need is there? Every good gift comes down from heaven to earth, it does not ascend from earth to heaven.'"

== Commentary from the Church Fathers ==
Chrysostom: But since John's baptism was to repentance, and therefore showed the presence of sin, that none might suppose Christ's coming to the Jordan to have been on this account, John cried to Him, I have need to be baptized of Thee, and comest Thou to me? As if he had said,

Pseudo-Chrysostom: That Thou shouldest baptize me there is good cause, that I may be made righteous and worthy of heaven; but that I should baptize Thee, what cause is there? Every good gift comes down from heaven upon earth, not ascends from earth to heaven.

Hilary of Poitiers: John rejects Him from baptism as God; He teaches him, that it ought to be performed on Him as man.

Preceded by Matthew 3:13	Gospel of Matthew; Chapter 3	Succeeded by Matthew 3:15
