= Matthew 3:15 =

- ← 3:14 3:16 →
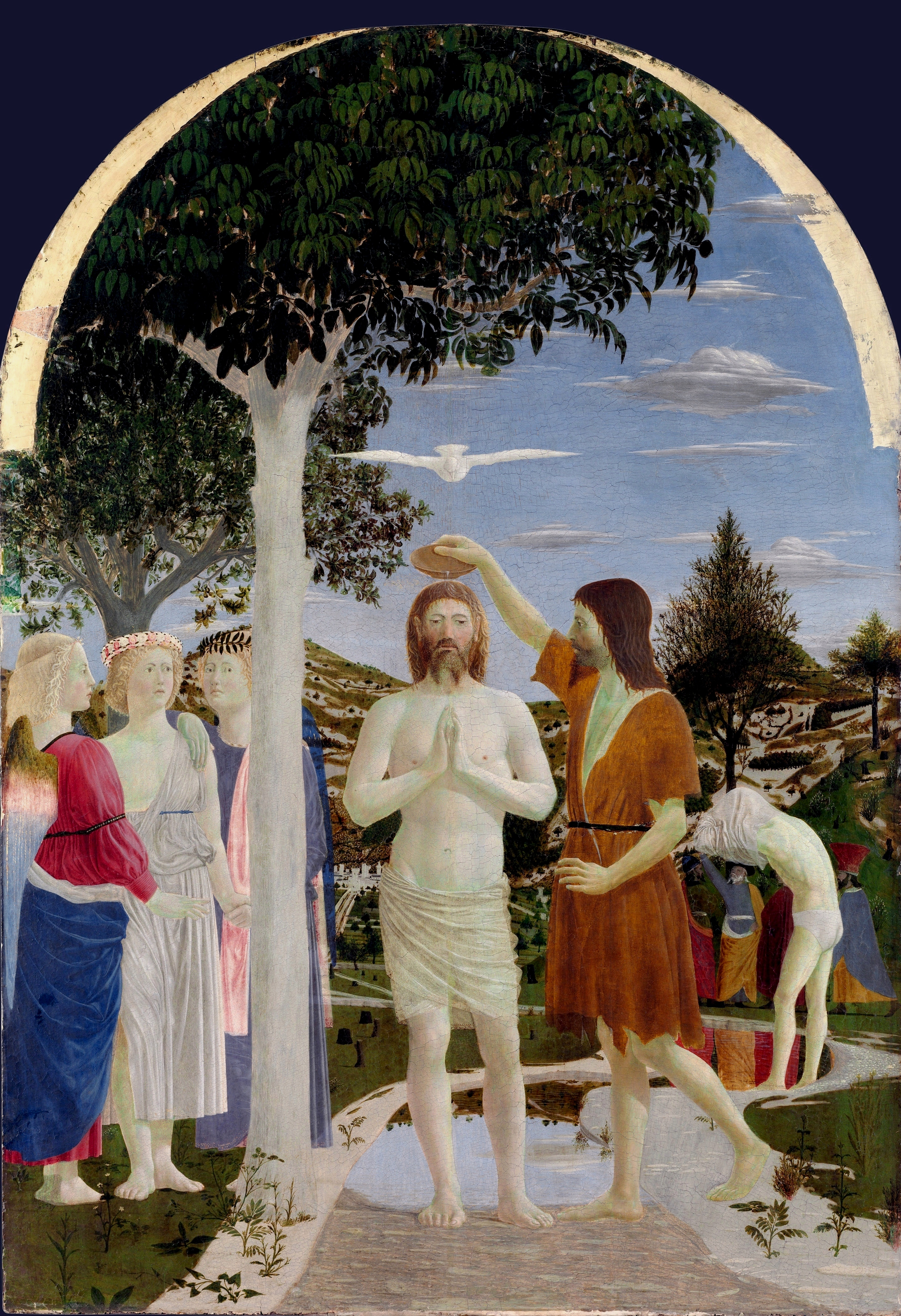
- The Baptism of Christ, by Piero della Francesca, c. 1448-50
- Book: Gospel of Matthew
- Christian Bible part: New Testament

Matthew 3:15 is the fifteenth verse of the third chapter of the Gospel of Matthew in the New Testament. Jesus has come to John the Baptist to be baptized, but John balked at this, saying that he should be the one baptized. In this verse, Jesus explains why it is right that He should be baptized.

In the King James Version of the Bible the text reads:

And Jesus answering said unto him,
Suffer it to be so now: for thus
it becometh us to fulfil all
righteousness. Then he suffered him

The World English Bible translates the passage as:

But Jesus, answering, said to him,
"Allow it now, for this is the
fitting way for us to fulfill all
righteousness." Then he allowed him.

The 1881 Westcott-Hort Greek text is:

αποκριθεις δε ο ιησους ειπεν αυτω
αφες αρτι ουτως γαρ πρεπον εστιν ημιν πληρωσαι πασαν δικαιοσυνην
τοτε αφιησιν αυτον

For a collection of other versions see BibleHub Matthew 3:15

== Analysis ==
These are the first words spoken by Jesus in the Gospel of Matthew, which is traditionally placed as the first book of the New Testament, so these are textually the first words spoken by Jesus in the entire Bible. (Note: The first recorded words spoken by Jesus prior to the event in Matthew 3:15 were at the temple at age 12 (Luke 2:49)) According to general scholarship, the first recorded words of Jesus are actually in Mark 1:15 (as it was considered the first Gospel that was written): "This is the time of fulfillment. The kingdom of God is at hand. So repent (mετανοείτε), and believe in the gospel."

Like the previous verse, this one only occurs in Matthew. Many scholars see this section as an add-on attempting to explain why the messiah is baptized by someone much lower than he is. The phrase "fulfill all righteousness" is a problematic one. Righteousness is an important concept in Matthew and it generally means obedience to God. Matthew also often uses the word "fulfill", almost always referring to an Old Testament prophecy which Jesus is fulfilling. David Hill notes that the phrase could thus be interpreted as Jesus fulfilling divine rules of which only he is aware. Cullman emphasizes the word all and argues that Jesus' baptism is to obtain righteousness for all humanity. Jesuit theologian Daniel Harrington links the fulfillment not to the Old Testament but to the discussion of fruits of repentance at Matthew 3:8.

A second important issue is why Jesus, who is sinless, should go through a ritual that is designed to cleanse all sins. There are two main explanations of this. One is that Jesus by being baptized is setting a good example for the rest of humanity, that while he does not himself need the cleansing he is showing how important it is for others. The second view is that Jesus' being baptized is part of the process of taking on the burden of the sins of all humanity. German theologian Heinrich Meyer lists and evaluates a number of reasons offered for why Jesus came to be baptized by John.

The Book of Mormon provides an additional perspective on these two issues, explaining that Jesus "fulfilled all righteousness" by humbly witnessing that he would obey the Father, thus setting an example for how "the children of men" should live.

Reformed Presbyterian theologian R. C. Sproul alternatively views Jesus as saying being baptized was necessary for Him to accomplish the Active Obedience of Christ.

Several of the Fathers of the Church infer from the words "it is fitting for us to fulfill all righteousness" that John was afterwards baptized by Jesus.

== Commentary from the Church Fathers ==
Jerome: Beautifully said is that now, to show that as Christ was baptized with water by John, so John must be baptized by Christ with the Spirit. Or, suffer now that I who have taken the form of a servant should fulfil all that low estate; otherwise know that in the day of judgment thou must be baptized with my baptism. Or, the Lord says, ‘Suffer this now; I have also another baptism wherewithal I must be baptized; thou baptize Me with water, that I may baptize thee for Me with thy own blood.’

Pseudo-Chrysostom: In this he shows that Christ after this baptized John; which is expressly told in some apocryphal books. Suffer now that I fulfil the righteousness of baptism in deed, and not only in word; first submitting to it, and then preaching it; for so it becometh us to fulfil all righteousness. Not that by being baptized He fulfils all righteousness, but so, in the same manner, that is, as He first fulfilled the righteousness of baptism by His deeds, and after preached it, so He might all other righteousness, according to that of the Acts, All things that Jesus began both to do and to teach. (Acts 1:1.) Or thus, all righteousness, according to the ordinance of human nature; as He had before fulfilled the righteousness of birth, growth, and the like.

Hilary of Poitiers: For by Him must all righteousness have been fulfilled, by whom alone the Law could be fulfilled.

Jerome: Righteousness; but he adds neither ‘of the Law;’ nor ‘of nature,’ that we may understand it of both.

Saint Remigius: Or thus; It becometh us to fulfil all righteousness, that is, to give an example of perfect justification in baptism, without which the gate of the kingdom of heaven is not opened. Hence let the proud take an example of humility, and not scorn to be baptized by My humble members when they see Me baptized by John My servant. That is true humility which obedience accompanies; as it continues, then he suffered Him, that is, at last consented to baptize Him.

== Notes ==
Preceded by Matthew 3:14	Gospel of Matthew; Chapter 3	Succeeded by Matthew 3:16
