= Matthew 3:17 =

- ← 3:16 4:1 →
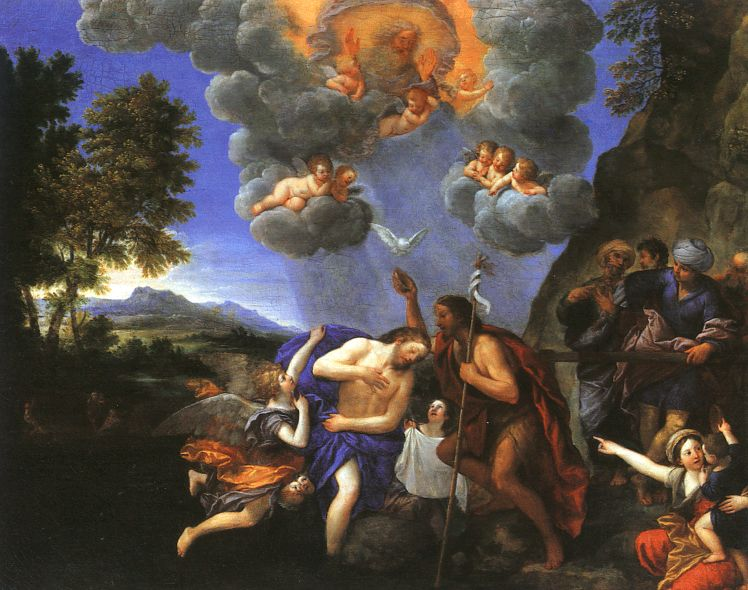
- Francesco Albani's The Baptism of Christ
- Book: Gospel of Matthew
- Christian Bible part: New Testament

Matthew 3:17 is the seventeenth (and final) verse of the third chapter of the Gospel of Matthew in the New Testament. Following Jesus' baptism by John the Baptist, a voice from heaven states that Jesus is "God's beloved son".

== Content ==
In the King James Version of the Bible, the text reads:

And lo a voice from heaven,
saying, This is my beloved
Son, in whom I am well pleased.

The World English Bible translates the passage as:

Behold, a voice out of the
heavens said, "This is my beloved
Son, with whom I am well pleased."

The 1881 Westcott-Hort Greek text is:

και ιδου φωνη εκ των ουρανων λεγουσα
ουτος εστιν ο υιος μου ο αγαπητος εν ω ευδοκησα

For a collection of other versions see BibleHub Matthew 3:17.

== Textual witnesses ==
Some early manuscripts containing the text of this verse are:

- Papyrus Oxyrhynchus 405 (~ 200)
- Papyrus 101 (3rd century)
- Codex Vaticanus (~325–350)
- Codex Sinaiticus (~330–360)
- Codex Washingtonianus (~400)
- Codex Bezae (~400)
- Codex Ephraemi Rescriptus (~450)

== Analysis ==
This verse ends the baptism scene (verses 13–17). The voice is generally presumed to be that of God the Father. This is one of only two times in the Gospel of Matthew where God intervenes directly, the other being in Matthew 17:5. This is in contrast to most of the Old Testament where God's direct actions occur regularly. Hill notes that the word beloved can be interpreted as meaning only. The entire message is often seen as a reference to Psalm 2:7. There is also a possible link to Isaiah 42:1, the opening verse of the first of the "servant songs", which also speaks of a beloved of whom God is pleased. Matthew uses this verse at 12:18, and it is translated in the same manner as it is here. The editors of the Jerusalem Bible suggest that Matthew's purpose here is to show that Jesus is the "suffering servant" foretold by Isaiah. The substitution of "son" for "servant" is possible because the Greek word παῖς (pais) can mean either "son" or "servant".

There are also possible links to Genesis 22:2 and Exodus 4:22.

Jesus' divine status was earlier implied at Matthew 1:18, but it does not become known to those around him until much later in the narrative. There is thus a debate over whether the voice in this verse was public pronouncement. In Luke the baptism occurs in front of a large crowd, but he and Mark both make the announcement seem private by having the message read "you are my son." Matthew's "this is my son" makes it seem as though all present were addressed. In Matthew no crowds are mentioned, and only Jesus and John are noted as being at the Jordan. The gospel is thus internally consistent, but is somewhat difficult to reconcile with the other two synoptics.

This verse, when combined with the one before it, is seen by many Christians as one of the most trinitarian passages in the entire New Testament. However, some writers disagree, since Matthew 3:16 already has the Holy Ghost present in the form of a dove. This verse does not clearly distinguish it as a distinct entity, the voice is assumed to be "God, the heavenly father", who makes explicit reference to Jesus as his son.

== Commentary from the Church Fathers ==
Augustine: Not as before by Moses and the Prophets, neither in type or figure did the Father teach that the Son should come, but openly showed Him to be already come, This is my Son.

Hilary of Poitiers: Or, that from these things thus fulfilled upon Christ, we might learn that after the washing of water the Holy Spirit also descends on us from the heavenly gates, on us also is shed an unction of heavenly glory, and an adoption to be the sons of God, pronounced by the Father's voice.

Jerome: The mystery of the Trinity is shown in this baptism. The Lord is baptized; the Spirit descends in shape of a dove; the voice of the Father is heard giving testimony to the Son.

Ambrose: And no wonder that the mystery of the Trinity is not wanting to the Lord's laver, when even our laver contains the sacrament of the Trinity. The Lord willed to show in His own case what He was after to ordain for men.

Pseudo-Augustine: Though Father, Son, and Holy Ghost are one nature, yet do thou hold most firmly that They be Three Persons; that it is the Father alone who said, This is my beloved Son; the Son alone over whom that voice of the Father was heard; and the Holy Ghost alone who in the likeness of a dove descended on Christ at His baptism.

Augustine: Here are deeds of the whole Trinity. In their own substance indeed Father, Son, and Holy Spirit are One without interval of either place or time; but in my mouth they are three separate words, and cannot be pronounced at the same time, and in written letters they fill each their several places. By this comparison may be understood how the Trinity in Itself indivisible may be manifested dividedly in the likeness of a visible creation. That the voice is that of the Father only is manifest from the words, This is my Son.

Hilary of Poitiers: He witnesses that He is His Son not in name merely, but in very kindred. Sons of God are we many of us; but not as He is a Son, a proper and true Son, in verity, not in estimation, by birth, not adoption.

Augustine: The Father loves the Son, but as a father should, not as a master may love a servant; and that as an own Son, not an adopted; therefore He adds, in whom I am well-pleased.

Saint Remigius: Or if it be referred to the human nature of Christ, the sense is, I am pleased in Him, whom alone I have found without sin. Or according to another reading, It hath pleased me to appoint Him, by whom to perform those things I would perform, i. e. the redemption of the human race.

Augustine: These words Mark and Luke give in the same way; in the words of the voice that came from Heaven, their expression varies though the sense is the same. For both the words as Matthew gives them, This is my beloved Son, and as the other two, Thou art my beloved Son, express the same sense in the speaker; (and the heavenly voice, no doubt, uttered one of these,) but one shows an intention of addressing the testimony thus borne to the Son to those who stood by; the other of addressing it to Himself, as if speaking to Christ He had said, This is my Son. Not that Christ was taught what He knew before, but they who stood by heard it, for whose sake the voice came. Again, when one says, in whom I am well-pleased; another, in thee it hath pleased me, if you ask which of these was actually pronounced by that voice; take which you will, only remembering that those who have not related the same words as were spoken have related the same sense. That God is well-pleased with His Son is signified in the first; that the Father is by the Son pleased with men is conveyed in the second form, in thee it hath well-pleased me. Or you may understand this to have been the one meaning of all the Evangelists, In Thee have I put My good pleasure, i. e. to fulfil all My purpose.

== Bibliography ==
- Albright, W.F. and C.S. Mann. "Matthew." The Anchor Bible Series. New York: Doubleday & Company, 1971.
- Clarke, Howard W. The Gospel of Matthew and its Readers: A Historical Introduction to the First Gospel. Bloomington: Indiana University Press, 2003.

| Preceded by Matthew 3:16 | Gospel of Matthew; Chapter 3 | Succeeded by Matthew 4:1 |
