= Matthew 3:16 =

- ← 3:15 3:17 →
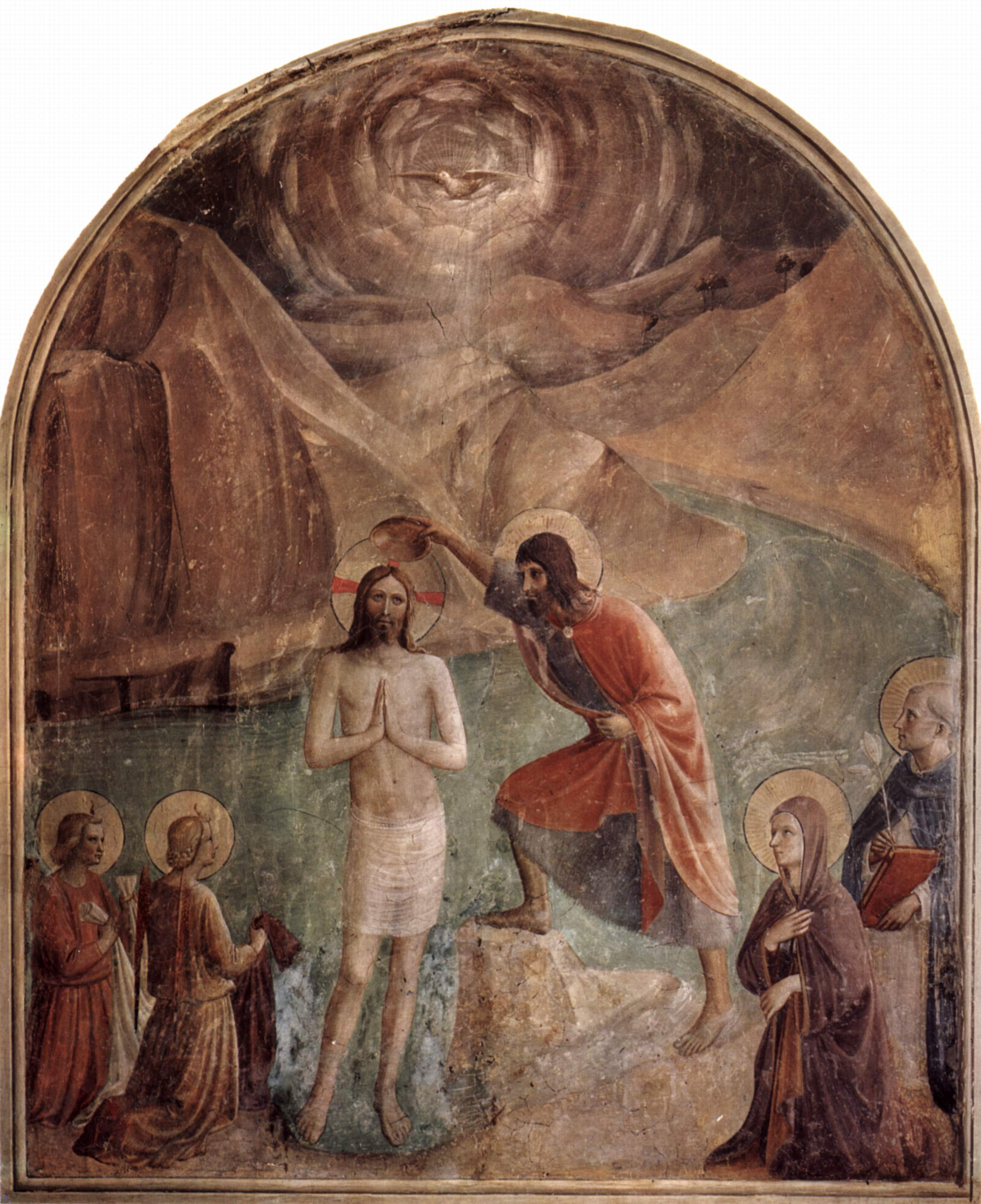
- Fra Angelico's Baptism of Christ
- Book: Gospel of Matthew
- Christian Bible part: New Testament

Matthew 3:16 is the sixteenth verse of the third chapter of the Gospel of Matthew in the New Testament. Jesus has just been baptized by John the Baptist and the Holy Spirit comes to him like a dove.

== Content ==
In the King James Version of the Bible the text reads:

And Jesus, when he was baptized, went
up straightway out of the water: and,
lo, the heavens were opened unto him,
and he saw the Spirit of God descending
like a dove, and lighting upon him:

The World English Bible translates the passage as:

Jesus, when he was baptized, went up
directly from the water: and behold,
the heavens were opened to him. He
saw the Spirit of God descending
as a dove, and coming on him.

The 1881 Westcott-Hort Greek text is:

βαπτισθεις δε ο ιησους ευθυς ανεβη απο του υδατος
και ιδου ηνεωχθησαν οι ουρανοι
και ειδεν πνευμα θεου καταβαινον ωσει περιστεραν
ερχομενον επ αυτον

For a collection of other versions see BibleHub Matthew 3:16.

== Analysis ==
Gundry notes the emphasis the author of Matthew gives to how quickly Jesus gets out of water of the Jordan. An emphasis not found in Mark or Luke. Gundry believes this is because the baptism would traditionally have been followed by a confessing of sins and the author of Matthew wanted to be clear that Jesus, who had no sins, did not undergo this part of the ritual.

France notes that the "heavens were opened" echoes Ezekiel 1:1. France feels that this might thus represent the return of the gift of prophecy to the earth. Hill notes that some early manuscripts have "opened up to him" rather than just "opened up." This makes the event a more private one, and helps explain why the crowds depicted as watching the baptism in Luke do not become aware of Jesus' status.

The dove imagery in this passage, and in the corresponding verse in Luke, is a well known one. Based on this verse the dove has long been a symbol for the Holy Spirit in Christian art. France notes that the wording in Matthew is vague, the Spirit could be descending in the shape of a dove or it could be descending in the manner of the dove. Luke is explicit that it is in the shape of a dove, and most readers accept this meaning.

This is the only event where the Spirit is described as taking such a form. There was a wide array of symbolism attached to the dove at the time the gospel was written. Albright and Mann note that in Hosea 7:11 and 11:11 the dove is a symbol for the nation of Israel. Clarke feels that this verse links to both Genesis 1:2, with the image of God hovering over the water, and to Genesis 8 where Noah sends a dove out over the water to search for land. Clarke feels the symbolism of the dove was thus one of creation with Jesus' baptism symbolically the rebirth of the world. In the Greco-Roman world the dove was at the time seen as a symbol of lust, as it was the symbol of Aphrodite. It was also a symbol of purity due to its whiteness and the belief that it was without bile.

The spirit "coming on him" may be a reference to a series of prophecies in Isaiah (11:2, 42:1, 61:1) where the spirit is described as being placed on God's chosen one. France notes that this doesn't mean the Holy Spirit has been absent from Jesus beforehand, as Matthew 1 makes clear it has been present since his conception.

== Church Fathers' commentary ==
Ambrose: For, as we have said, when the Saviour was washed, then the water was cleansed for our baptism, that a laver might be ministered to the people who were to come. Moreover, it behoved that in Christ's baptism should be signified those things which the faithful obtain by baptism.

Pseudo-Chrysostom: This action of Christ's has a figurative meaning pertaining to all who were after Him to be baptized; and therefore he says, straightway He ascended, and not simply He ascended, for all who are worthily baptized in Christ, straightway ascend from the water; that is, make progress in virtues, and are carried on towards a heavenly dignity. They who had gone down to the water carnal and sinful sons of Adam, straightway ascend from the water spiritual sons of God. But if some by their own faults make no progress after baptism, what is that to the baptism?

Rabanus Maurus: As by the immersion of His body He dedicated the laver of baptism, He has shown that to us also after baptism received the entrance to heaven is open, and the Holy Spirit is given, as it follows, and the heavens were opened.

Jerome: Not by an actual cleaving of the visible element, but to the spiritual eye, as Ezekiel also in the beginning of his book relates that he saw them.

Pseudo-Chrysostom: For had the actual creation of the heavens been opened, he would not have said were opened to Him, for a physical opening would have been open to all. But some one will say, What, are the heavens then closed to the eye of the Son of God, who even when on earth is present in heaven? But it must be known, that as He was baptized according to the ordinance of humanity that He had taken on Him, so the heavens were opened to His sight as to His human nature, though as to His divine He was in heaven.

Saint Remigius: But was this then the first time that the heavens were opened to Him according to His human nature? The faith of the Church both believes and holds that the heavens were no less open to Him before than after. It is therefore said here, that the heavens were opened, because to all them who are born again the door of the kingdom of heaven is opened.

Glossa Ordinaria: Or, so bright a glory shone round about Christ, that the blue concave seemed to be actually cloven.

Chrysostom: But though you see it not, be not therefore unbelieving, for in the beginnings of spiritual matters sensible visions are always offered, for their sakes who can form no idea of things that have no body; which if they occur not in later times, yet faith may be established by those wonders once wrought.

Saint Remigius: As to all those who by baptism are born again, the door of the kingdom of heaven is opened, so all in baptism receive the gifts of the Holy Spirit.

Augustine: Christ after He had been once born among men, is born a second time in the sacraments, that as we adore Him then born of a pure mother, so we may now receive Him immersed in pure water. His mother brought forth her Son, and is yet virgin; the wave washed Christ, and is holy. Lastly, that Holy Spirit which was present to Him in the womb, now shone round Him in the water, He who then made Mary pure, now sanctifies the waters.

Pseudo-Chrysostom: The Holy Ghost took the likeness of a dove, as being more than other animals susceptible of love. All other forms of righteousness which the servants of God have in truth and verity, the servants of the Devil have in spurious imitation; the love of the Holy Spirit alone an unclean spirit cannot imitate. And the Holy Ghost has therefore reserved to Himself this special manifestation of love, because by no testimony is it so clearly seen where He dwells as by the grace of love.

Rabanus Maurus: Seven excellencies in the baptized are figured by the dove. The dove has her abode near the rivers, that when the hawk is seen, she may dive under water and escape; she chooses the better grains of corn; she feeds the young of other birds; she does not tear with her beak; she lacks a gall; she has her rest in the caverns of the rocks; for her song she has a plaint. Thus the saints dwell beside the streams of Divine Scripture, that they may escape the assaults of the Devil; they choose wholesome doctrine, and not heretical for their food; they nourish by teaching and example, men who have been the children of the Devil, i. e. the imitators; they do not pervert good doctrine by tearing it to pieces as the heretics do; they are without hate irreconcileable; they build their nest in the wounds of Christ's death, which is to them a firm rock, that is their refuge and hope; as others delight in song, so do they in groaning for their sin.

Chrysostom: It is moreover an allusion to ancient history; for in the deluge this creature appeared bearing an olive-branch, and tidings of rest to the world. All which things were a type of things to come. For now also a dove appears pointing out to us our liberator, and for an olive-branch bringing the adoption of the human race.

Jerome: It sate on the head of Jesus, that none might suppose the voice of the Father spoken to John, and not to the Lord.

== Textual witnesses ==
Some early manuscripts containing the text of this verse are:

- Papyrus Oxyrhynchus 405 (~ 200)
- Papyrus 101 (3rd century)
- Codex Vaticanus (~325–350)
- Codex Sinaiticus (~330–360)
- Codex Washingtonianus (~400)
- Codex Bezae (~400)
- Codex Ephraemi Rescriptus (~450)

| Preceded by Matthew 3:15 | Gospel of Matthew; Chapter 3 | Succeeded by Matthew 3:17 |
