= Papyrus 101 =

- New Testament manuscript
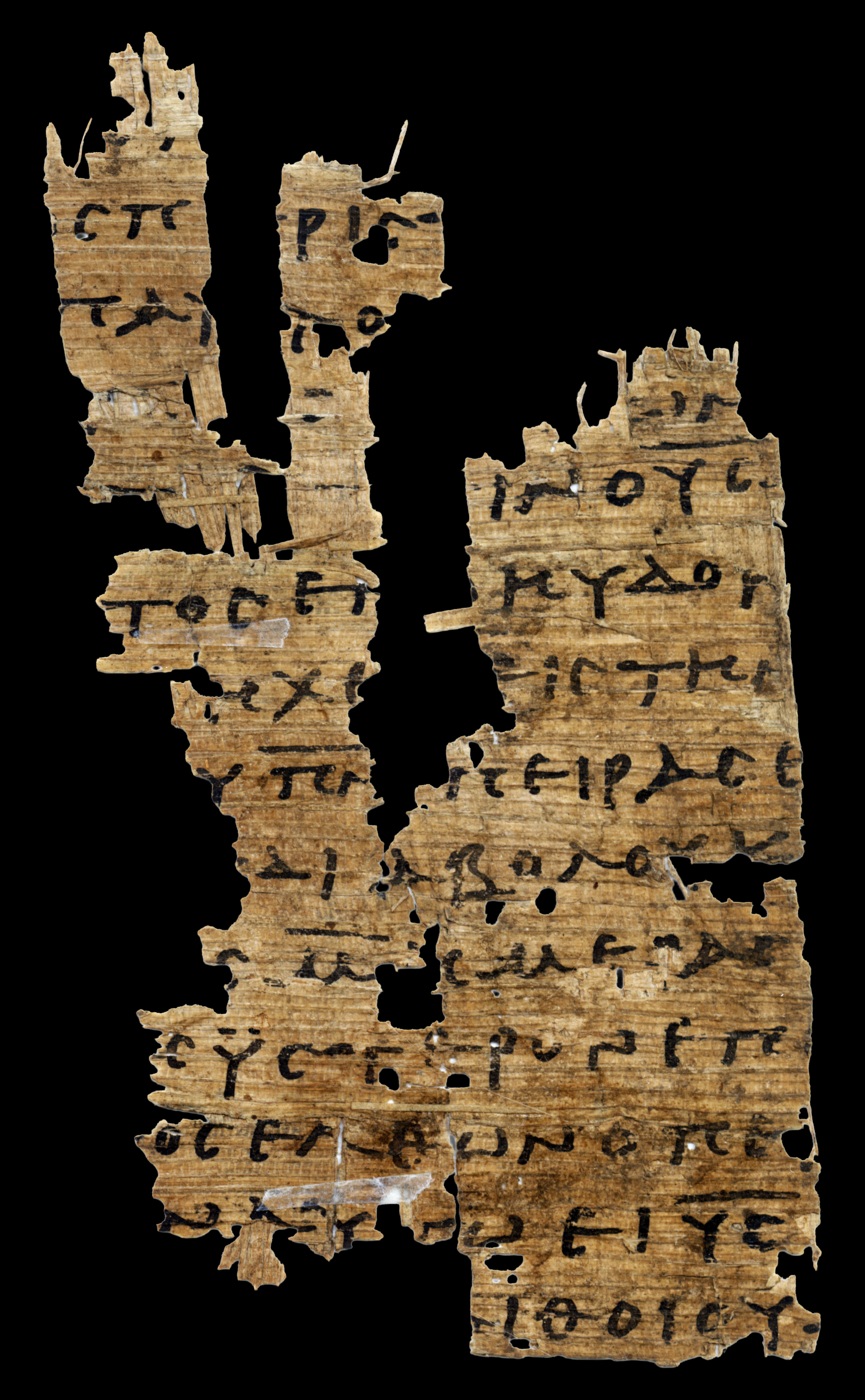
- Recto, Matt 3:10-12
- Name: P. Oxy. 4401
- Sign: 𝔓^{101}
- Text: Gospel of Matthew 3:10-12; 3:16-4:3
- Date: 3rd century AD
- Script: Greek
- Found: Oxyrhynchus, Egypt
- Now at: Sackler Library
- Cite: J. David Thomas, OP LXIV (1997), pp. 2-4.
- Size: 19 x 7.5 cm
- Type: Alexandrian text-type

Papyrus 101, also known as P. Oxy. 66 4401, is an early copy of the New Testament in Greek. It is a papyrus manuscript of the Gospel of Matthew. The surviving texts of Matthew are verses 3:10-12; 3:16-4:3, they are in a fragmentary condition. It is designated by the siglum 𝔓^{101} in the Gregory-Aland numbering of New Testament manuscripts. Using the study of comparative writing styles (palaeography), it has been assigned to the 3rd century CE. It is one of the numerous manuscripts found at the site of Oxyrhynchus.

Text

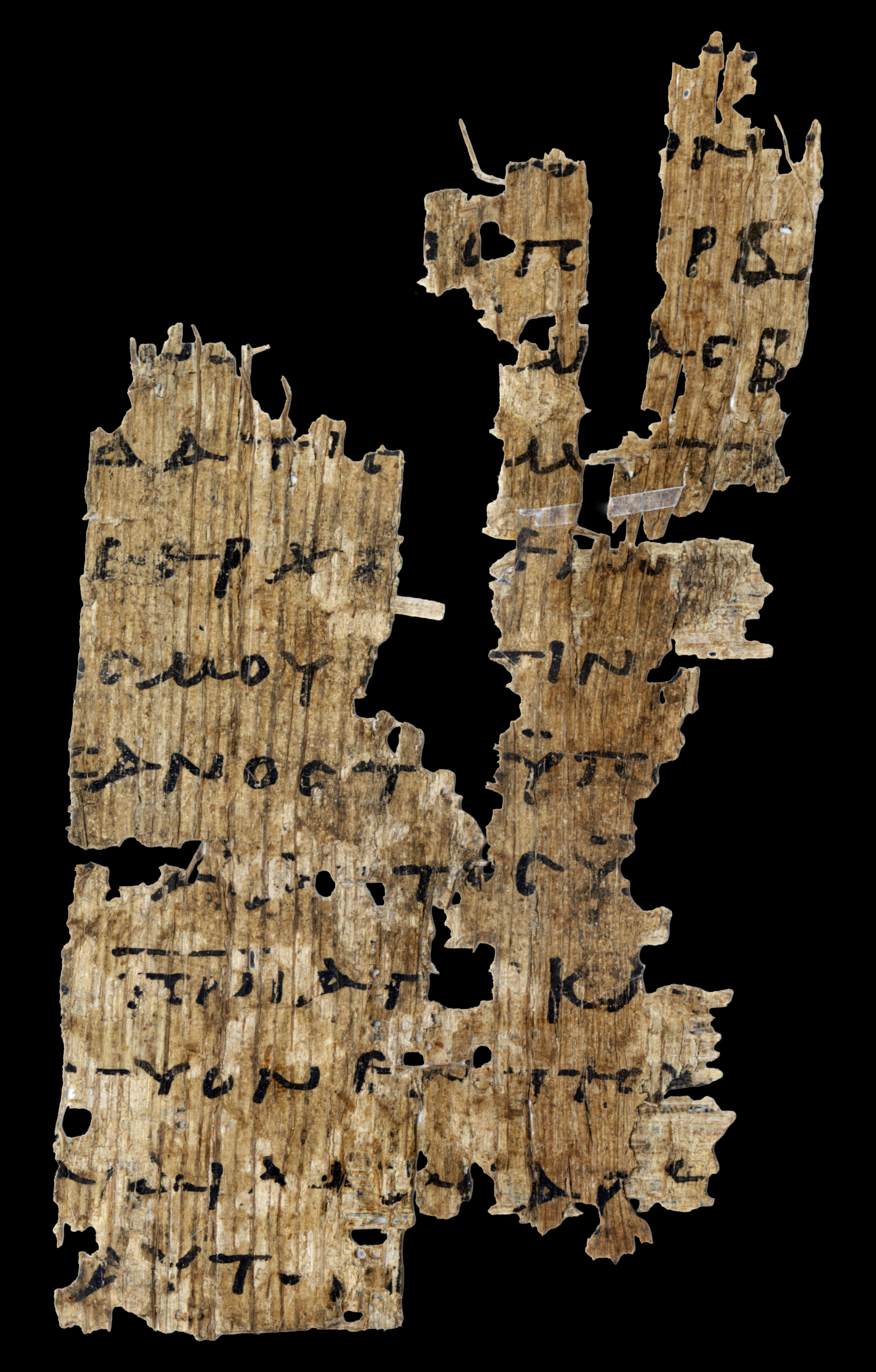
Verso, Matthew 3:16-4:3

The Greek text of the codex considered to be a representative of the Alexandrian text-type.

Location

The manuscript is currently housed at the Sackler Library (Papyrology Rooms, P. Oxy. 4401) at Oxford.

== Textual Variants ==
- 3:10: εις (into) becomes προς (towards).
- 3:11: omits οπισω μου (after me).
- 3:11: βαστασαι (to bear) is changed to λυσαι (to untie). The missing space on the line above could also include κυφας (bending down), therefore almost conforming the text to the same as Mark 1:7.
- 3:16: ωσαι (as if it were) becomes ως (like).
- 3:16: και (and) is omitted from after περιστεραν (dove).
- 3:17: ευδοκησα (well pleased) becomes ηυδοκησα, a variant spelling.
- 4:2: ημερας τεσσερακοντα και νυκτας τεσσερακοντα (days forty and nights forty) becomes μ̅ ημερας και μ̅ νυκτας (forty days and forty nights (the numeral μ̅ representing "forty")).

== See also ==
- List of New Testament papyri
