= Matthew 2:10 =

- ← 2:9 2:11 →
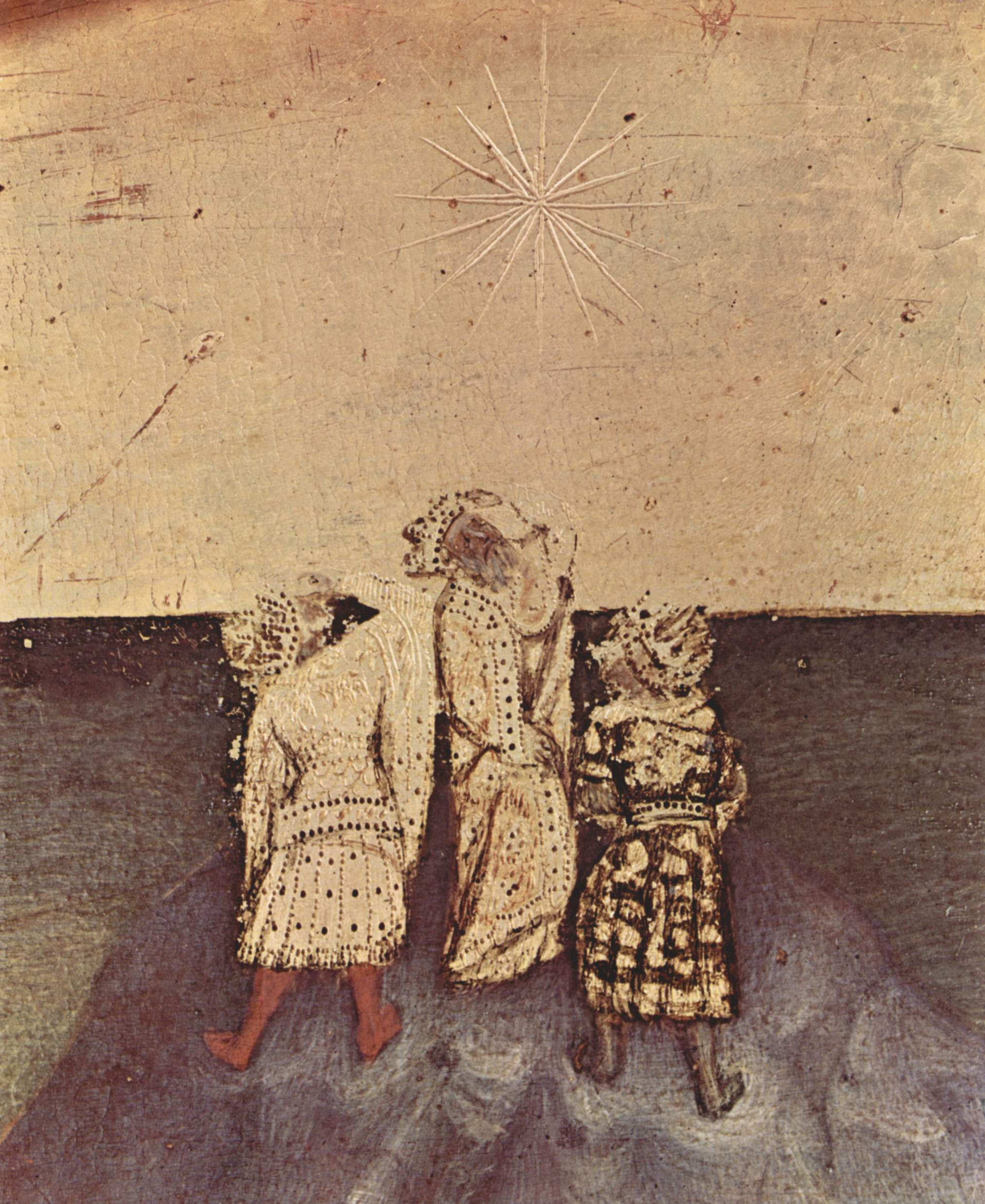
- The Magi and the star, Gentile da Fabriano - 1423
- Book: Gospel of Matthew
- Christian Bible part: New Testament

Matthew 2:10 is the tenth verse of the second chapter of the Gospel of Matthew in the New Testament. The magi, dispatched by King Herod, have been shown the location of the infant Jesus by the Star of Bethlehem. In this verse they react to this.

== Content ==
In the King James Version of the Bible the text reads:

When they saw the star,
they rejoiced with
exceeding great joy.

The World English Bible translates the passage as:

When they saw the star,
they rejoiced with
exceedingly great joy.

The Novum Testamentum Graece text is:

ἰδόντες δὲ τὸν ἀστέρα
ἐχάρησαν χαρὰν μεγάλην σφόδρα.

For a collection of other versions see BibleHub Matthew 2:10.

== Analysis ==
The main observation on this verse is how hard the author of Matthew strives to prove the joy of the magi. The phrase "rejoiced with exceedingly great joy" piles modifiers on the basic joy of the magi. Gundry notes that the Matthew is the only gospel to use such constructions. Reid links the joy felt with the Magi upon first encountering Jesus with the joy of the disciples upon doing the same at Matthew 13:20.

Gundry sees this part of the chapter as an embellishment on the Gospel of Luke, and this verse as a magnified version of Luke 2:10. Perhaps the star over Jerusalem was the Holy Spirit, or Angel of the Lord, descending upon the virgin Mary.

== Commentary from the Church Fathers ==
Glossa Ordinaria: This service of the star is followed by the rejoicing of the Magi.

Saint Remigius: And it was not enough to say, They rejoiced, but they rejoiced with exceeding great joy.

Pseudo-Chrysostom: They rejoiced, because their hopes were not falsified but confirmed, and because the toil of so great travel had not been undertaken in vain.

Glossa Ordinaria: He rejoices indeed who rejoices on God's account, who is the true joy. With great joy, he says, for they had great cause.

Pseudo-Chrysostom: By the mystery of this star they understood that the dignity of the King then born exceeded the measure of all worldly kings.

Saint Remigius: He adds greatly, showing that men rejoice moreover what they have lost than over what they possess.

== Resources ==
- Albright, W.F. and C.S. Mann. "Matthew." The Anchor Bible Series. New York: Doubleday & Company, 1971.
- Brown, Raymond E. The Birth of the Messiah: A Commentary on the Infancy Narratives in Matthew and Luke. London: G. Chapman, 1977.

Preceded by Matthew 2:9	Gospel of Matthew; Chapter 2	Succeeded by Matthew 2:11
