= Matthew 2:7 =

- ← 2:6 2:8 →
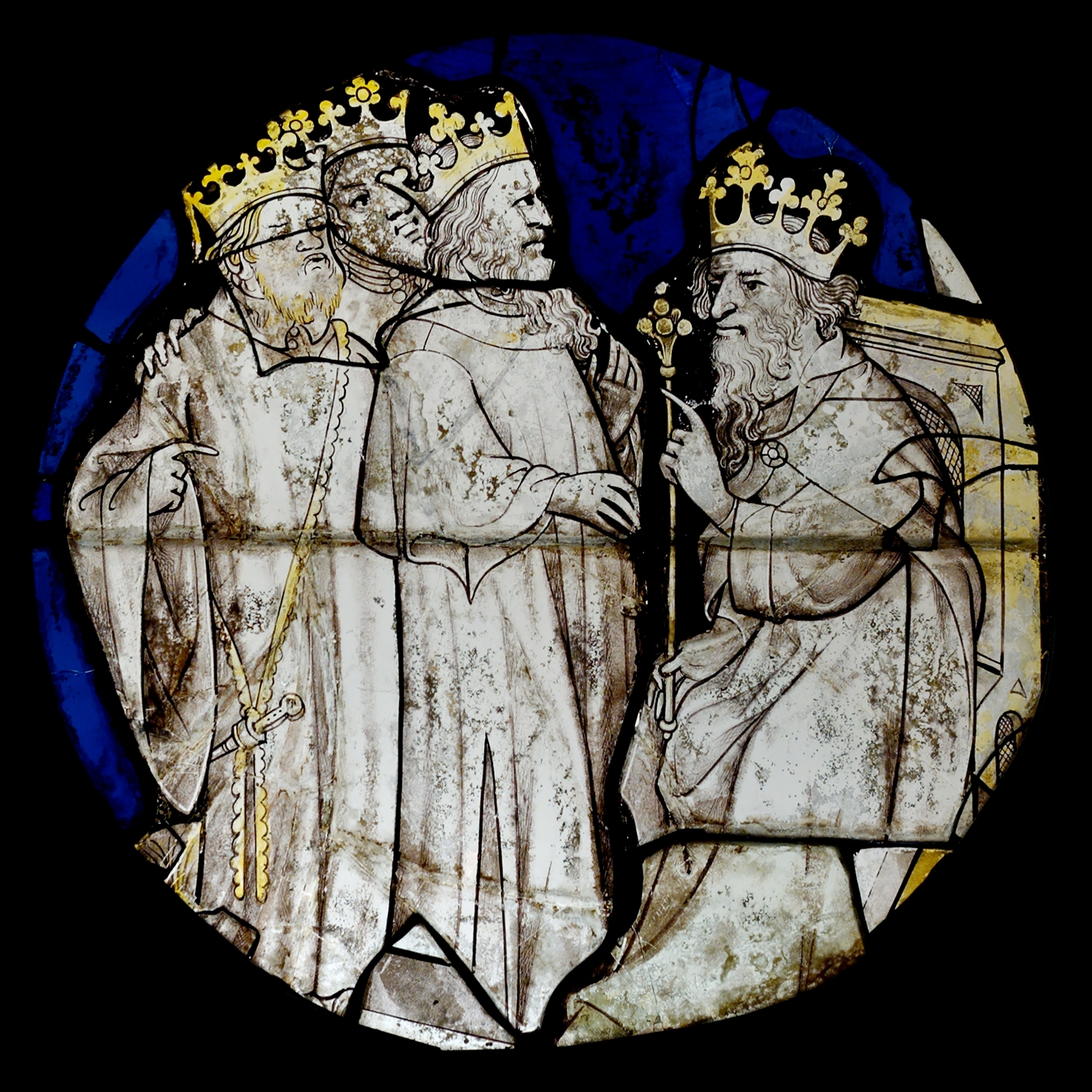
- The three Magi before Herod, France, early 15th century. Musée de Cluny/Musée national du Moyen Âge, Paris.
- Book: Gospel of Matthew
- Christian Bible part: New Testament

Matthew 2:7 is the seventh verse of the second chapter of the Gospel of Matthew in the New Testament. The magi have informed King Herod that they had seen portents showing the birth of the King of the Jews. Herod has consulted with the leading Jewish religious figures who reported he was to be born in Bethlehem. In this verse Herod again questions the magi.

== Content ==
In the King James Version of the Bible the text reads:

Then Herod, when he had privily called the wise men,
enquired of them diligently what time the star appeared.

The World English Bible translates the passage as:

Then Herod secretly called the wise men, and learned
from them exactly what time the star appeared.

The Novum Testamentum Graece text is:

Τότε Ἡρῴδης λάθρᾳ καλέσας τοὺς μάγους
ἠκρίβωσεν παρ’ αὐτῶν τὸν χρόνον τοῦ φαινομένου ἀστέρος,

For a collection of other versions see BibleHub Matthew 2:7

== Analysis ==
Brown notes that the phrase translated as "enquired of them diligently" is in Greek a single technical astrological word with no direct translation.

Holding the meeting in secret shows Herod's closed and suspicious nature, however it also raises the question of how the author Matthew knows what took place. France believes the specific question about time is part of Herod's attempt to determine when the child was born, and would later lead to his timing decision for the Massacre of the Innocents.

== Commentary from the Church Fathers ==
Pseudo-Chrysostom: As soon as Herod had heard the answer, though doubly authenticated, both by the authority of the Priests, and the passage from the Prophets, he yet turned not to worship the King that was to be born, but sought how he might put Him to death by subtilty. He saw that the Magi were neither to be won by flattery, nor awed by threats, nor bribed by gifts, to consent to this murder; he sought therefore to deceive them; he privily called the wise men; that the Jews, whom he suspected, might not know of it. For he thought they would incline the rather to a King of their own nation.

Saint Remigius: Diligently enquired; craftily, for he feared they would not return to him, and then he should know how he should do to put the young Child to death.

Pseudo-Augustine: The star had been seen, and with great wonder, nearly two years before. We are to understand that it was signified to them whose the star was, which was visible all that time till He, whom it signified, was born. Then as soon as Christ was made known to them they set out, and came and worshipped Him in thirteen days from the east.

Chrysostom: Or, the star appeared to them a long time before, because the journey would take up some time, and they were to stand before Him immediately on His birth, that seeing Him in swaddling clothes, He might seem the more wonderful.

Glossa Ordinaria: According to others, the star was first seen on the day of the nativity, and having accomplished its end, ceased to be. Thus Fulgentius says, “The Boy at His birth created a new star.” Though they now knew both time and place, he still would not have them ignorant of the person of the Child, Go, he says, and enquire diligently of the young Child; a commission they would have executed even if he had not commanded it.

Chrysostom: Concerning the young Child, he says, not ‘of the King;’ he envicts Him the regal title.

Preceded by Matthew 2:6	Gospel of Matthew; Chapter 2	Succeeded by Matthew 2:8
