= Matthew 1:24 =

- ← 1:23 1:25 →
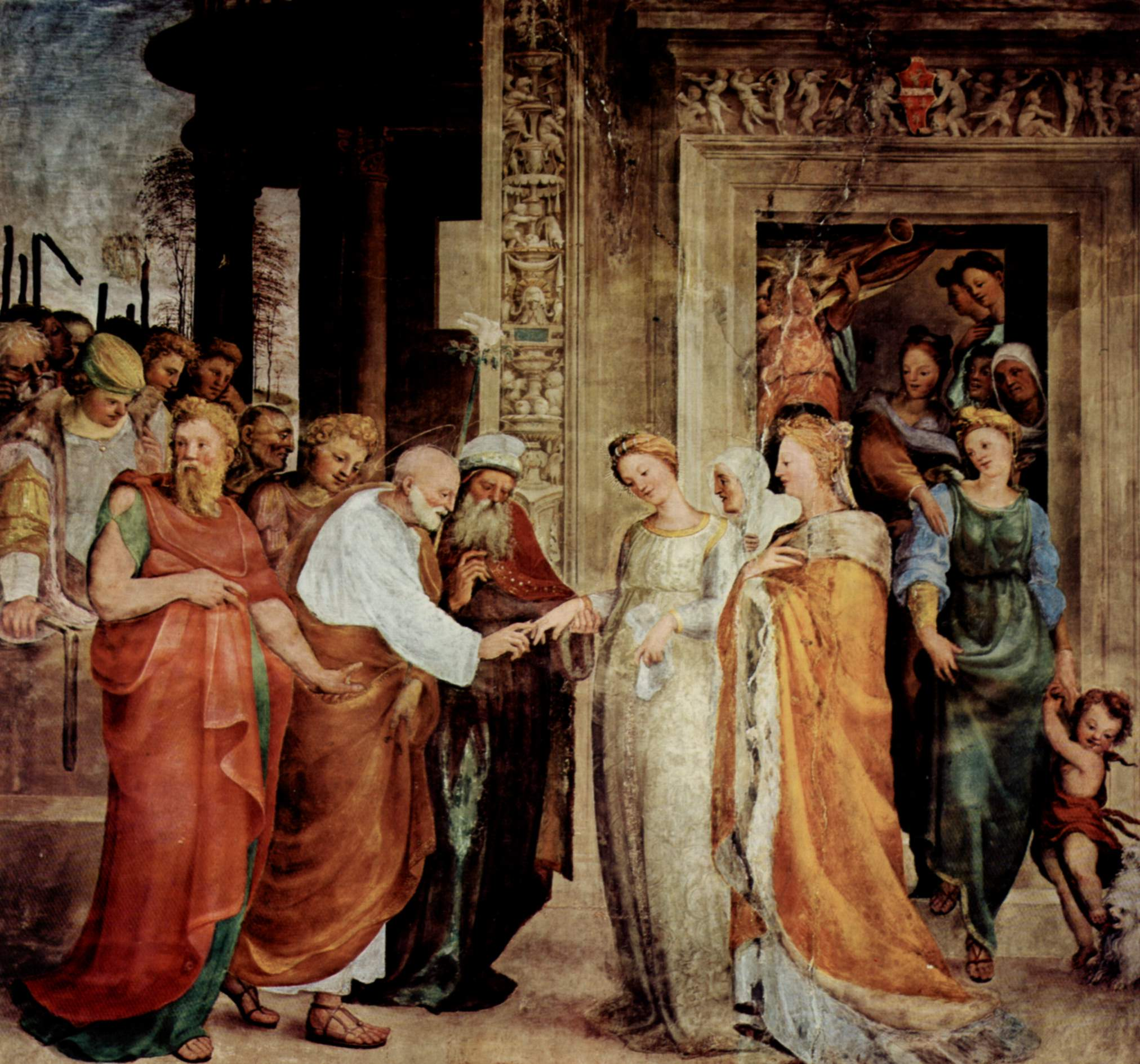
- Mary and Joseph by Domenico Beccafumi c. 1518
- Book: Gospel of Matthew
- Christian Bible part: New Testament

Matthew 1:24 is the twenty-fourth verse of the first chapter in the Gospel of Matthew in the New Testament. Joseph has just been informed of the nature of Jesus and what he should do by an angel. In this verse Joseph carries out the angel's instructions.

== Content ==
The original Koine Greek, according to Westcott and Hort, reads:

εγερθεις δε [ο] ιωσηφ απο του υπνου εποιησεν ως προσεταξεν
αυτω ο αγγελος κυριου και παρελαβεν την γυναικα αυτου

In the King James Version of the Bible the text reads:

Then Joseph being raised from sleep did as the angel
of the Lord had bidden him, and took unto him his wife:

The World English Bible translates the passage as:

Joseph arose from his sleep, and did as the angel of the
Lord commanded him, and took his wife to himself;

For a collection of other versions see BibleHub Matthew 1:24

== Analysis ==
Joseph carries out the angel's instructions exactly. "Taking his wife" refers to the second portion of the marriage ritual. Mary and Joseph had already been wed, but by tradition, the bride stayed in her father's home for another year or so. At that point, the husband would take the wife into his home. It is this second phase of the marriage that "take his wife" refers to. The Greek and the later text (verse 25) make clear this is not a euphemism for sexual relations. Jones notes that rapid and unquestioning obedience, as shown here by Joseph, is an important virtue in the Gospel.

== Commentary from the Church Fathers ==
Saint Remigius: Life returned by the same entrance through which death had entered in. By Adam's disobedience we were ruined, by Joseph's obedience we all begin to be recalled to our former condition; for in these words is commended to us the great virtue of obedience, when it is said, And Joseph rising from sleep, did as the Angel of the Lord had commanded him.

Glossa Ordinaria: He not only did what the Angel commanded, but as he commanded it. Let each one who is warned of God, in like manner, break off all delays, rise from sleep, and do that which is commanded him.

Pseudo-Chrysostom: Took unto him, not took home to him; for he had not sent her away; he had put her away in thought only, and now took her again in thought.

Saint Remigius: Or, Took her so far, as that the nuptial rites being complete, she was called his wife; but not so far as to lie with her, as it follows, And knew her not.

Preceded by Matthew 1:23	Gospel of Matthew; Chapter 1	Succeeded by Matthew 1:25
