= Matthew 2:5 =

- ← 2:4 2:6 →
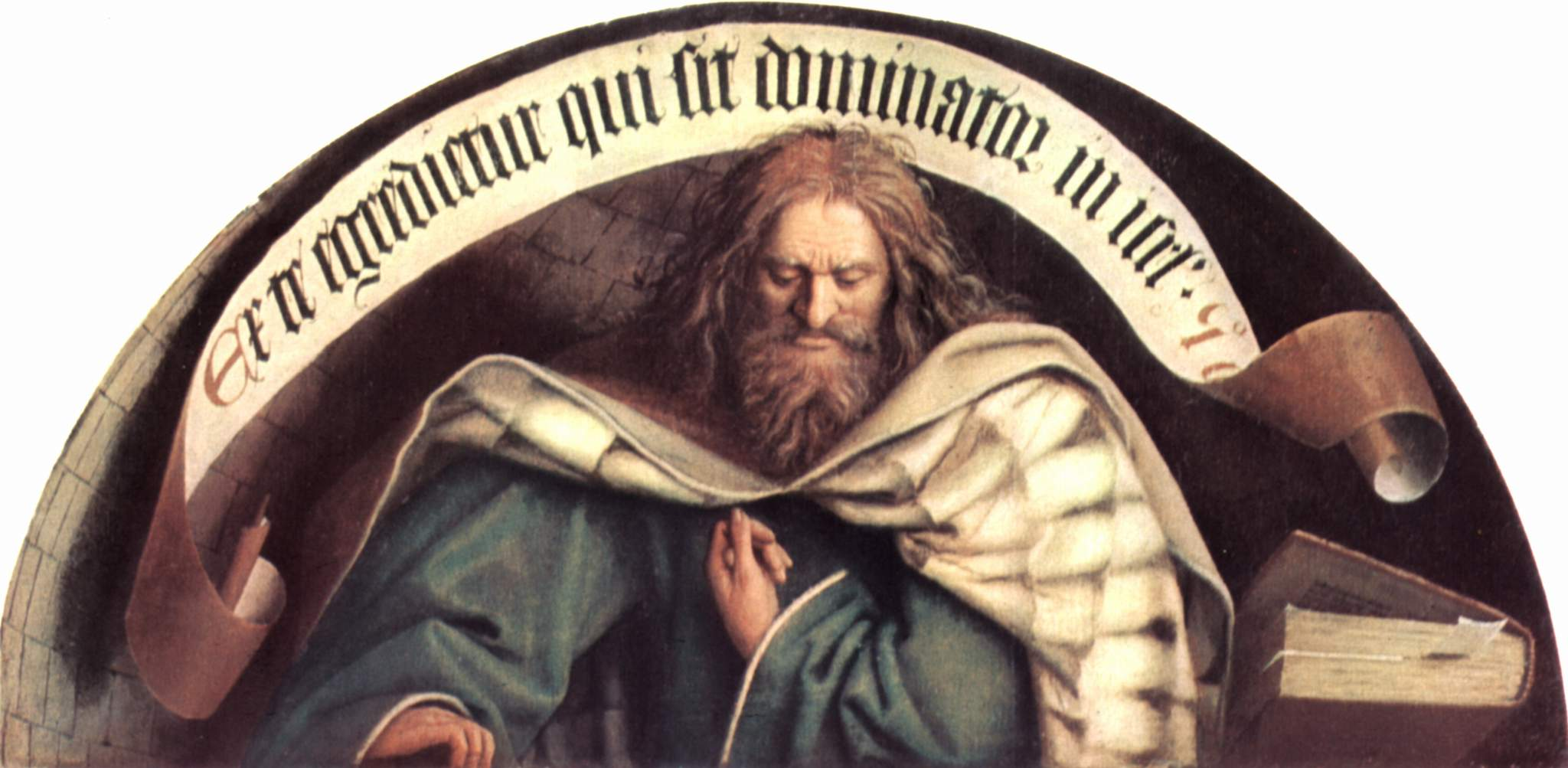
- The prophet Micah by Hubert van Eyck
- Book: Gospel of Matthew
- Christian Bible part: New Testament

Matthew 2:5 is the fifth verse of the second chapter of the Gospel of Matthew in the New Testament. The magi have informed King Herod that they had seen portents showing the birth of the King of the Jews. Herod has asked the leading Jewish religious figures about how to find out where Jesus was to be born. In this verse they tell him.

== Content ==
In the King James Version of the Bible the text reads:

And they said unto him, In Bethlehem of Judaea:
for thus it is written by the prophet,

The World English Bible translates the passage as:

They said to him, "In Bethlehem of Judea,
for this is written through the prophet,

The Novum Testamentum Graece text is:

οἱ δὲ εἶπαν αὐτῷ Ἐν Βηθλεὲμ τῆς Ἰουδαίας
οὕτως γὰρ γέγραπται διὰ τοῦ προφήτου

For a collection of other versions see BibleHub Matthew 2:5

== Analysis ==
This verse mainly serves as a lead into the next one, which is a quote from Micah chapter 5 (5:2–4), and Micah is thus the prophet mentioned here. It is notable that Matthew does not use his usual introduction to a quote from the Old Testament. Normally Matthew introduces a quote with the phrase "so it might be fulfilled," while in this verse he integrates it into the dialogue.

Gundry notes that the text again mentions that Bethlehem is in Judea, as does the next verse. This was previously noted in Matthew 2:1, and in theory the first mention was enough to disambiguate between the various towns named Bethlehem. To Gundry this is clear evidence of how important Jesus being born in Judea, at the centre of the Jewish world, was to Matthew and those he was writing for.

== Commentary from the Church Fathers ==
Pope Leo I: The Magi, judging as men, sought in the royal city for Him, whom they had been told was born a King. But He who took the form of a servant, and came not to judge but to be judged, chose Bethlehem for His birth, Jerusalem for His death.

Theodotus of Byzantium: Had He chosen the mighty city of Rome, it might have been thought that this change of the world had been wrought by the might of her citizens; had He been the son of the emperor, his power might have aided Him. But what was His choice? All that was mean, all that was in low esteem, that in this transformation of the world, divinity might at once be recognized. Therefore, He chose a poor woman for His mother, a poor country for His native country; He has no money, and this stable is His cradle.

Gregory the Great: Rightly is He born in Bethlehem, which signifies the house of bread, who said, am the living bread, who came down from heaven.

Pseudo-Chrysostom: When they should have kept secret the mystery of the King appointed of God, especially before a foreign king, straightway they became not preachers of the word of God, but revealers of His mystery. And they not only display the mystery, but cite the passage of the prophet, viz. Micah.

Preceded by Matthew 2:4	Gospel of Matthew; Chapter 2	Succeeded by Matthew 2:6
