= Matthew 2:3 =

- ← 2:2 2:4 →
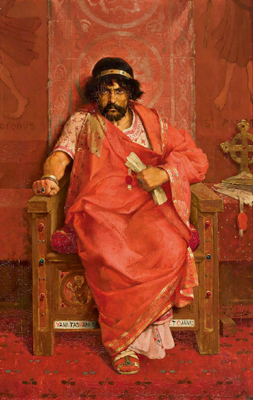
- An imagined view of Herod on his throne by Théophile Lybaert
- Book: Gospel of Matthew
- Christian Bible part: New Testament

Matthew 2:3 is the third verse of the second chapter of the Gospel of Matthew in the New Testament. In the previous verse the magi had informed King Herod that they had seen portents showing the birth of the King of the Jews. In this verse he reacts to this news.

== Content ==
In the King James Version of the Bible the text reads:

When Herod the king had heard these things, he
was troubled, and all Jerusalem with him. (Note: For a collection of other versions see BibleHub Matthew 2:3.)

The Novum Testamentum Graece text is:

ἀκούσας δὲ ὁ βασιλεὺς Ἡρῴδης
ἐταράχθη, καὶ πᾶσα Ἱεροσόλυμα μετ’ αὐτοῦ,

== Analysis ==
That Herod should be troubled by the King of the Jews being born is not surprising. As an Edomite Herod was open to challenge from someone claiming to be the heir of King David, and the central theme of Matthew 1 is Jesus' Davidic status. Moreover, Herod was renowned for his paranoia, killing several of his own sons who threatened him.

That all Jerusalem is agitated also seems to conflict with later in the Gospel when the people are oblivious to Jesus. R. T. France suggests that the passage could perhaps be read as showing that the people of Jerusalem were troubled because of the possibility of Herod's wrath. Other scholars see this interpretation as being fairly implausible. Brown notes that this phrase originates in Exodus. There is a theory that this part of Matthew is heavily influenced by the story of Moses. In Exodus, all Egypt is troubled by Moses, not just the Pharaoh. Thus in parallel all Jerusalem must also be troubled. This view was shared by St. John Chrysostom.

Gundry sees this passage as influenced by the politics of the time it was written, a foreshadowing of the rejection of Jesus and his church by the leaders of Jerusalem. Paul L. Maier disagrees, "If Matthew had concocted the account for such apologetic purposes, he failed quite miserably." R.T. France says "The supposed parallel is far from exact."

Keener argues that Matthew is contrasting the goodness of the pagan Magi against the residents of Jerusalem as part of his overall advocacy of Christian outreach beyond the Jewish community. Matthew challenges his reader's negative views of outsiders by contrasting these foreigners with the behaviour of those in Jerusalem. Levin believes the verse reflects Matthew's social critique against the wealthy and powerful city dwellers.

Gundry notes that this verse again makes sure to note Herod is a king. He sees this as an effort by the author of Matthew to create a deliberate contrast with Jesus, with Herod being the embodiment of all the things Jesus is not.

== Commentary from the Church Fathers ==
Augustine: As the Magi seek a Redeemer, so Herod fears a successor.

Glossa Ordinaria: The King, he is called, though in comparison with him whom they are seeking he is an alien and a foreigner.

Pseudo-Chrysostom: Herod was troubled when he heard that a King was born of Jewish lineage, lest, himself being an Idumæan, the kingdom should return again to native princes, and himself be expelled, and his seed after him. Great station is ever obnoxious to great fears, as the boughs of trees planted in high ground move when never so little wind blows, so high men are troubled with little rumours; while the lowly, like trees in the valley, remain at peace.

Augustine: If His birth as an infant makes proud kings tremble, what will His tribunal as a Judge do? Let princes fear Him sitting at the right hand of His Father, whom this impious king feared while He hanged yet on His mother's breast.

Pope Leo I: Thou art troubled, Herod, without cause. Thy nature cannot contain Christ, nor is the Lord of the world content with the narrow bounds of thy dominion. He, whom thou wouldest not should reign in Judæa, reigns everywhere.

Glossa Ordinaria: Perhaps he was troubled not on his own account, but for fear of the displeasure of the Romans. They would not allow the title of King or of God to any without their permission.

Gregory the Great: At the birth of a King of Heaven, a king of earth is troubled; surely, earthly greatness is confounded, when heavenly greatness shows itself.

Pope Leo I: Herod represents the Devil; who as he then instigated him, so now he unweariedly imitates him. For he is grieved by the calling of the Gentiles, and by the daily ruin of his power.

Pseudo-Chrysostom: Both have their own causes of jealousy, both fear a successor in their kingdom; Herod an earthly successor, the Devil a spiritual. Even Jerusalem is troubled, which should have rejoiced at that news, when a Jewish King was said to be risen up. But they were troubled, for the wicked cannot rejoice at the coming of the good. Or perhaps it was in fear that Herod should wreak his wrath against a Jewish King on his race.

Glossa Ordinaria: Jerusalem was troubled with him, as willing to favour him whom it feared; the vulgar always pay undue honour to one who tyrannizes over it. Observe the diligence of his enquiry. If he should find him, he would do to him as he showed afterwards his disposition; if he should not, he would at least be excused to the Romans.

== Notes ==
Preceded by Matthew 2:2	Gospel of Matthew; Chapter 2	Succeeded by Matthew 2:4
