= Matthew 2:6 =

- ← 2:5 2:7 →
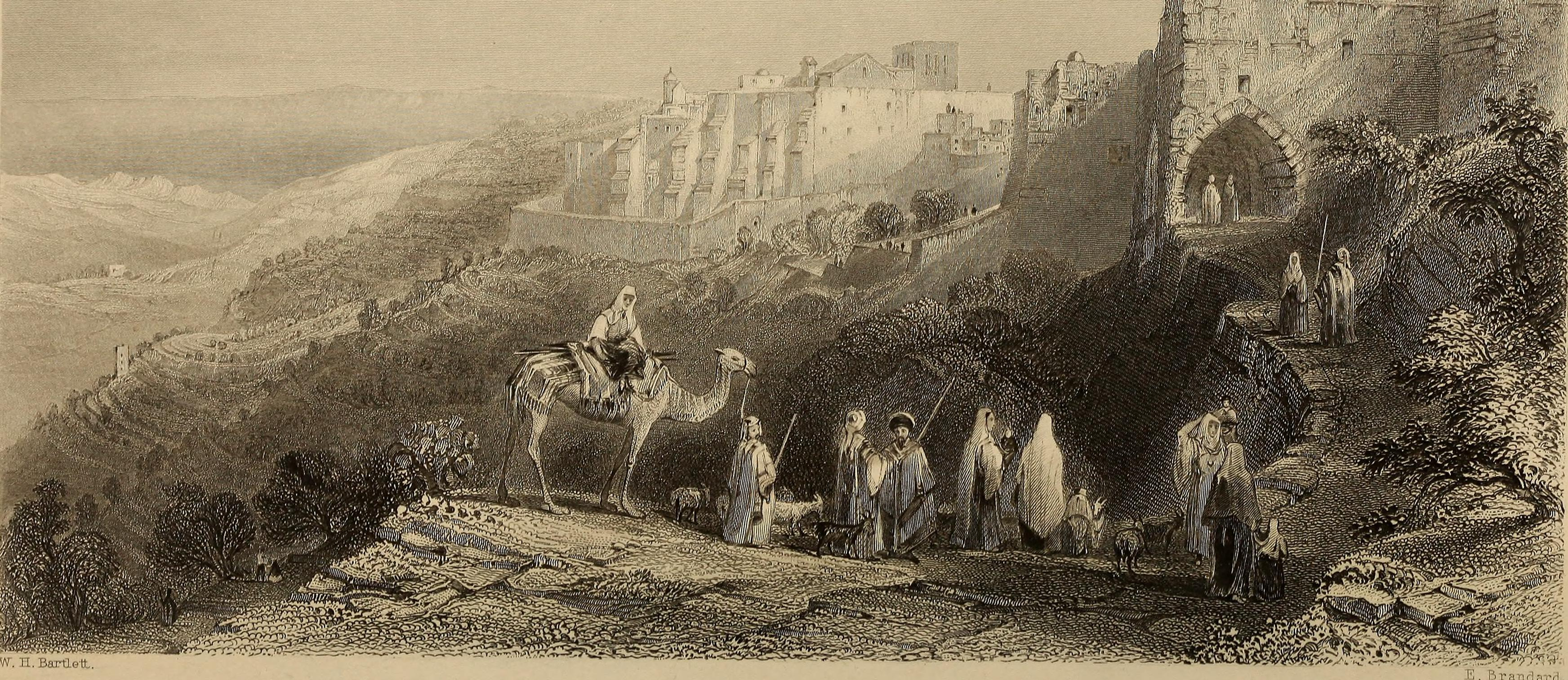
- "Bethlehem… Micah v. 2. Upon the side of yonder hill, … is set that little city…". Illustration from The Holy Land and the Bible (1888)
- Book: Gospel of Matthew
- Christian Bible part: New Testament

Matthew 2:6 is the sixth verse of the second chapter of the Gospel of Matthew in the New Testament. The magi have informed King Herod that they had seen portents showing the birth of the King of the Jews. Herod has asked the leading Jewish religious figures about how to find out where Jesus was to be born. In this verse they tell him by quoting from the Book of Micah.

== Content ==
In the King James Version of the Bible the text reads:

And thou Bethlehem, in the land of Juda, art not the
least among the princes of Juda: for out of thee shall
come a Governor, that shall rule my people Israel.

The World English Bible translates the passage as:

You Bethlehem, land of Judah, are in no way least among
the princes of Judah: for out of you shall come forth
a governor, who shall shepherd my people, Israel."

The Novum Testamentum Graece text is:

Καὶ σὺ Βηθλεέμ, γῆ Ἰούδα,
οὐδαμῶς ἐλαχίστη εἶ ἐν τοῖς ἡγεμόσιν Ἰούδα
ἐκ σοῦ γὰρ ἐξελεύσεται ἡγούμενος,
ὅστις ποιμανεῖ τὸν λαόν μου τὸν Ἰσραήλ.

For a collection of other versions see BibleHub Matthew 2:6

== Analysis ==
This verse is taken from Micah 5:2. Unlike the previous time Matthew quoted the Old Testament in Matthew 1:23 the wording does not seem to be taken from the Septuagint, rather it seems to be an original translation from the Hebrew. Matthew's version differs substantially from both the Septuagint and Masoretic.

Matthew's translation has several important differences from that found in the Septuagint. The King James Version of Micah 5:2, based on the Septuagint, reads:

But thou, Bethlehem Ephratah,
though thou be little among the
thousands of Judah, yet out of
thee shall he come forth unto
me that is to be ruler in Israel;

Ephratah was a town near the Bethlehem in Judea. Clarification was needed as there was at least one other town named Bethlehem at the time. Referencing a larger neighbour as well as the province were accepted methods of clarification at the time, but it is not clear why Matthew changes the form. Two other references to Bethlehem being in Judea in Matthew 2:1 and 2:5 indicate that Matthew was keen to show that Jesus was born in Judea. In this verse he does not use the same spelling he did previously, thus also linking to the Old Testament figure Judah.

In the second line, the author of Matthew reverses the meaning of the original. The original states that Bethlehem was a town of little importance in which a great thing would happen. Matthew's rewording creates the meaning that it would not be a town of little importance, since great things would happen there.

Brown also reports that Matthew replaces the word ruler in the original, perhaps to emphasize that despite what most Jews were predicting, the messiah would not be a political figure, only a spiritual one.

The portion of Micah where this quote is found is clearly discussing the messiah and states that like King David the messiah's origin would be in Bethlehem. At the time, it was not widely accepted that the messiah would necessarily be born in Bethlehem, just that his ancestors would have been. It was thus not considered essential for a messiah to be someone born in that town, but it was considered a reasonable locale for a messiah to originate -- far more reasonable than the peripheral and little known town of Nazareth in Galilee where Jesus grew up.

== Commentary from the Church Fathers ==
Glossa Ordinaria: He quotes this prophecy as they quote who give the sense and not the words.

Jerome: The Jews are here blamed for ignorance; for whereas the prophecy says, Thou Bethlehem Ephrata; they said, ‘Bethlehem in the land of Judah.’

Pseudo-Chrysostom: By cutting short the prophecy, they became the cause of the murder of the Innocents. For the prophecy proceeds, From thee shall go forth a King who shall feed My people Israel, and His day shall be from everlasting. Had they cited the whole prophecy, Herod would not have raged so madly, considering that it could not be an earthly King whose days were spoken of as from everlasting.

Jerome: The following is the sense of the prophecy. Thou, Bethlehem, of the land of Judah, or Ephrata, (which is added to distinguish it from another Bethlehem in Galilee,) though thou art a small village among the thousand cities of Judah, yet out of thee shall be born Christ, who shall be the Ruler of Israel, who according to the flesh is of the seed of David, but was born of Me before the worlds; and therefore it is written, His goings forth are of old. In the beginning was the Word.

Glossa Ordinaria: This latter half of the prophecy the Jews dropped; and other parts they altered, either through ignorance, (as was said above,) or for perspicuity, that Herod who was a foreigner might better understand the prophecy; thus for Ephrata, they said, land of Judah; and for little among the thousands of Judah, which expresses its smallness contrasted with the multitude of the people, they said, not the least among the princes, willing to show the high dignity that would come from the birth of the Prince. As if they had said, Thou art great among cities from which princes have come.

Saint Remigius: Or the sense is; though little among cities that have dominion, yet art thou not the least, for out of thee shall come the Ruler, who shall rule My people Israel; this Ruler is Christ, who rules and guides His faithful people.

Chrysostom: Observe the exactness of the prophecy; it is not He shall be in Bethlehem, but shall come out of Bethlehem; showing that He should be only born there. What reason is there for applying this to Zorobabel, as some do? For his goings forth were not from everlasting; nor did he go forth from Bethlehem, but was born in Babylonia. The expression, art not the least, is a further proof, for none but Christ could make the town where He was born illustrious. And after that birth, there came men from the utmost ends of the earth to see the stable and manger. He calls Him not ‘the Son of God,’ but (he Ruler who shall govern My people Israel; for thus He ought to condescend at the first, that they should not be scandalized, but should preach such things as more pertained to salvation, that they might be gained. Who shall rule My people Israel, is said mystically, for those of the Jews who believed; for if Christ ruled not all the Jews, theirs is the blame. Meanwhile he is silent respecting the Gentiles, that the Jews might not be scandalized. Mark this wonderful ordinance; Jews and Magi mutually instruct each other; the Jews learn of the Magi that a star had proclaimed Christ in the east, the Magi from the Jews that the Prophets had spoken of Him of old. Thus confirmed by a twofold testimony, they would look with more ardent faith for One whom the brightness of the star and the voice of the Prophets equally proclaimed.

Augustine: The star that guided the Magi to the spot where was the Infant God with His Virgin Mother, might have conducted them straight to the town; but it vanished, and showed not itself again to them till the Jews themselves had told them the place where Christ should be born; Bethlehem of Judæa. Like in this to those who built the ark for Noah, providing others with a refuge, themselves perished in the flood; or like to the stones by the road that show the miles, but themselves are not able to move. The enquirers heard and departed; the teachers spake and remained still. Even now the Jews show us something similar; for some Pagans, when clear passages of Scripture are shown them, which prophesy of Christ, suspecting them to be forged by the Christians, have recourse to Jewish copies. Thus they leave the Jews to read unprofitably, and go on themselves to believe faithfully.

Preceded by Matthew 2:5	Gospel of Matthew; Chapter 2	Succeeded by Matthew 2:7
