= Matthew 2:11 =

- ← 2:10 2:12 →
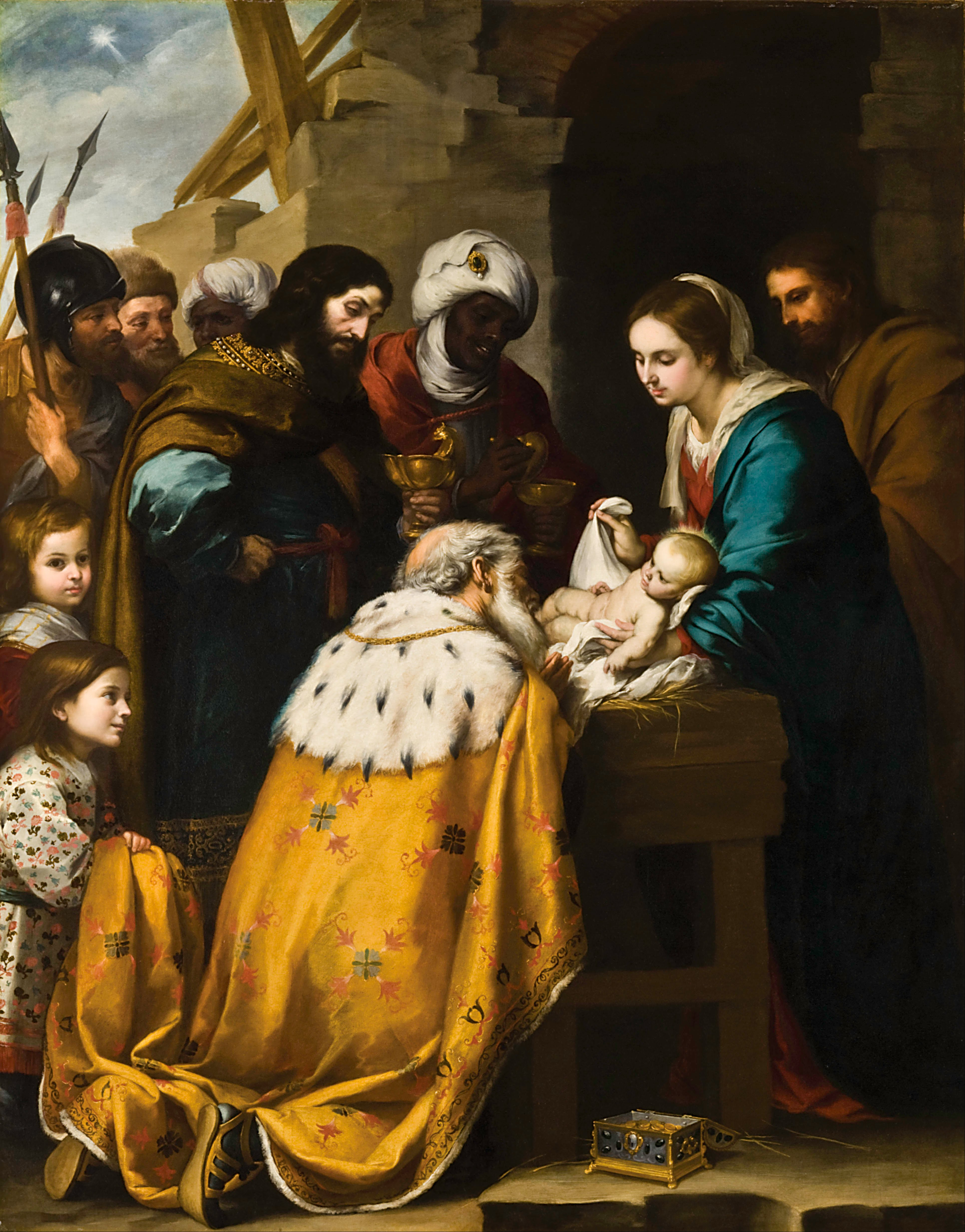
- Adoration of the Magi by Bartolomé Estéban Murillo
- Book: Gospel of Matthew
- Christian Bible part: New Testament

Matthew 2:11 is the eleventh verse of the second chapter of the Gospel of Matthew in the New Testament. The magi, dispatched by King Herod, have found the small child (not infant) Jesus and in this verse present him with gifts in an event known as the Visit of the Wise Men. In art (an infant jesus), is traditionally referred to as the Adoration of the Magi.

== Text ==
The original Koine Greek, according to Westcott and Hort, reads:

και ελθοντες εις την οικιαν ειδον το παιδιον μετα
μαριας της μητρος αυτου και πεσοντες προσεκυνησαν
αυτω και ανοιξαντες τους θησαυρους αυτων προσηνεγκαν
αυτω δωρα χρυσον και λιβανον και σμυρναν

In the King James Version of the Bible the text reads:

And when they were come into the house, they
saw the young child with Mary his mother, and
fell down, and worshipped him and when
they had opened their treasures, they presented
unto him gifts; gold, and frankincense and myrrh.

The World English Bible translates the passage as:

They came into the house and saw the young
child with Mary, his mother, and they fell
down and worshiped him. Opening their
treasures, they offered to him gifts: gold,
frankincense, and myrrh.

For a collection of other versions see BibleHub Matthew 2:11

== Arrival at the house ==
The word house in this verse is much disputed. According to the chronology in Luke, the family left Bethlehem soon after arriving, when Jesus was eight days old. This raises the question of why the family has its own home in the town when the magi visit. Most modern scholars believe that the author of Matthew is fairly clear in this chapter that the Holy Family had lived for some time in the town and was likely originally from Bethlehem, and thus it is logical for them to have a house. This reading contradicts Luke's story of the emergency trip to the town, however. Those willing to accept that Matthew and Luke cannot be exactly synchronized also today generally feel that the magi visited several months after the birth of Jesus. Those who believe in the inerrancy of the Bible believe that it could have been possible that the couple found a house very quickly. Alternatively some have argued that the word house should actually be translated as "village," but most scholars do not see much evidence for this theory. France argues that there is no contradiction between the stable in Luke and the house in Matthew, as in that era the stable for animals was a part of the average peasant house. It was common for a lower level to house animals and an upper one people. Jesus might just have been born on the lower level of the house his family continue to reside in when the Magi arrive.

The Magi are reported as worshiping the infant. The Bible makes clear throughout that the only figure who should be worshiped is God. Bruner considers this to be an indirect evidence that Jesus is God, something perhaps never explicitly stated in the New Testament. This is also a sharp difference from Mark. In that gospel Jesus is worshiped only once, but in Matthew it is common. The term "falling down" more properly means kneeling with their head on the ground before the infant. Clarke reports that the kneeling here and in Luke 5:8 had an important effect on the Christian church. Previously both Jewish and Roman tradition had viewed kneeling as undignified. Inspired by these verses, kneeling was adopted in the early church and has remained an important element of Christian worship to this day.

This verse covers the entirety of the interaction between the Magi and the Holy Family. Bruner notes that Jesus is entirely passive. This is in sharp contrast to many pieces of the apocryphal literature where the infant Jesus regularly performs miracles. Matthew gives no hint of such behaviour anywhere in his infancy narrative. Bruner also notes that the entirety of the Magi's devotion is directed towards the child, with no special treatment given to Mary.

== Gifts of the Magi ==
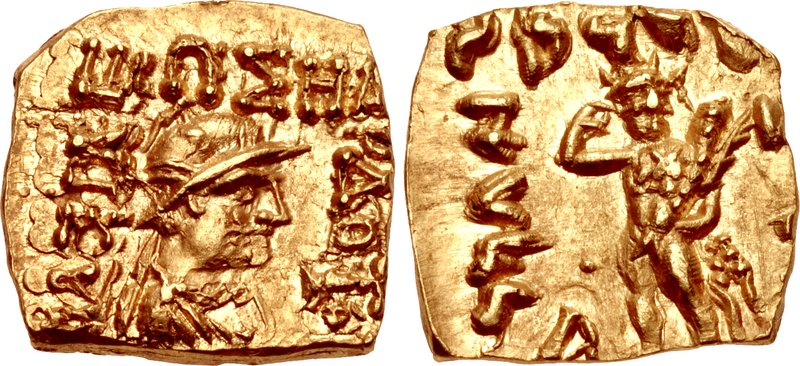
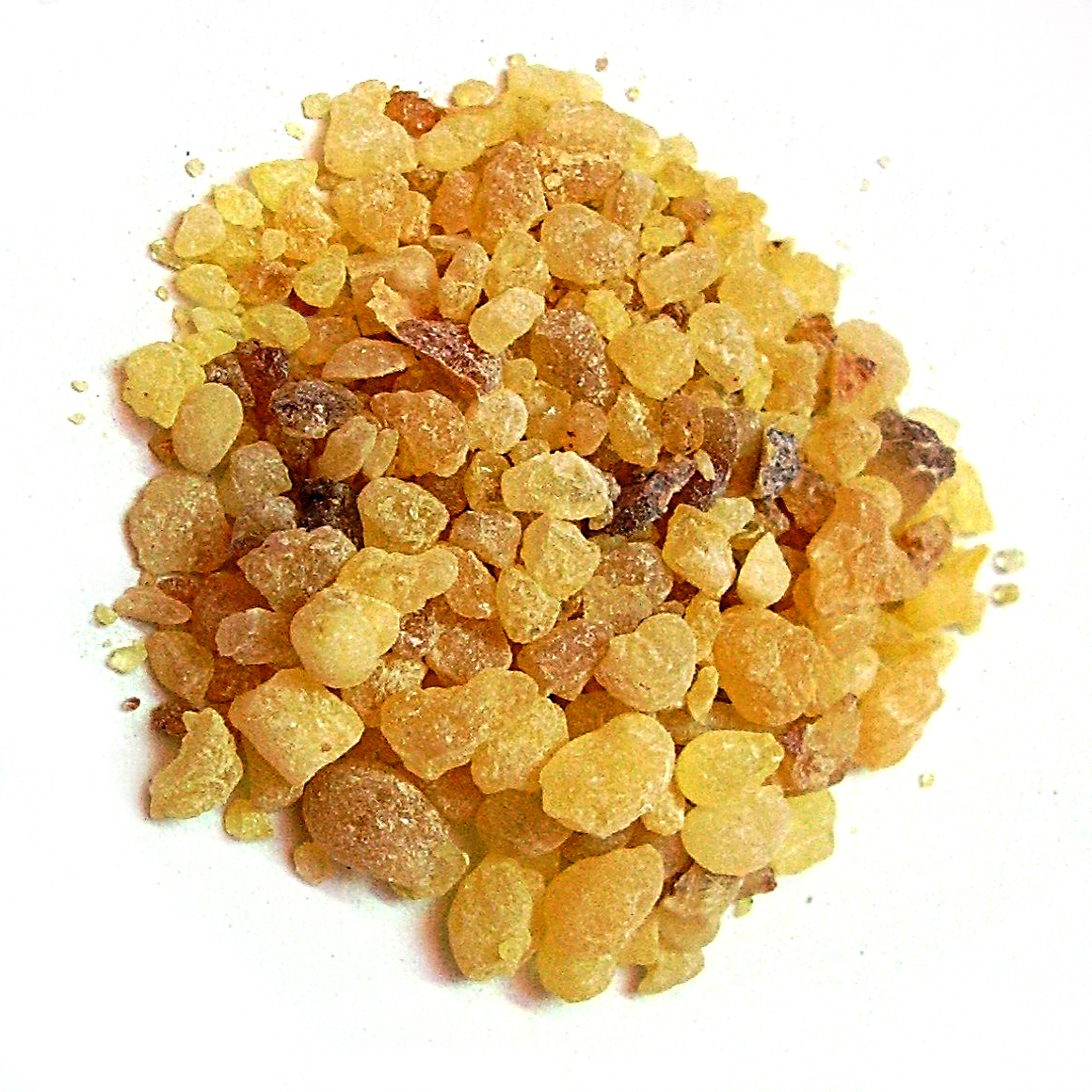
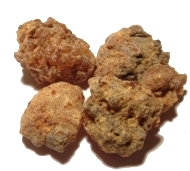
The three gifts of the magi, left to right: gold, frankincense, and myrrh.

The gifts of the magi are some of the best known items in the Gospel of Matthew. They are often linked to Isaiah 60:6 and Psalm 72. Both of these verses report gifts being given by kings. This played the central role in the tradition that developed that the magi were kings, something that is never stated in the scripture. That there were three gifts also led to the assumption that there were three magi. Matthew never gives an exact number, merely saying that there was more than one.

Many different theories of the meaning and symbolism of the gifts have been advanced. They are seen as gifts for a king, showing Jesus' role as King of the Jews. Myrrh was especially important as a substance traditionally used in the anointing of kings. Another tradition developed that gold represented virtue, incense prayer, and myrrh suffering. The gifts were ascribed to particular magi, who were given individual names and characters: the gold was traditionally given by Melchior, the myrrh by Balthasar, and the incense by Gaspar. John Chrysostom suggested that the gifts were fit to be given not just to a king but to God, and contrasted them with the Jews' traditional offerings of sheep and calves. Accordingly, Chrysostom asserts that the magi worshiped Jesus as God. All three gifts are typical of Arabia and thus somewhat counter the traditional Persian origin of the Magi.

C.S. Mann has advanced the theory that the items were not actually brought as gifts, but were rather the tools of the magi. The magi were astrologers and occultists and all three items have been attested as important tools of the magicians' trade. Mann thus sees the giving of these items to Jesus as showing that the magi were abandoning their occult practices by relinquishing the necessary tools of their trade. Brown disagrees with this theory as the portrayal of the magi and their arts had been wholly positive up to this point with no hint of condemnation.

The gifts themselves have also been criticized as mostly useless to a poor carpenter and his family. Clarke states that deist Thomas Woolston once quipped, "If they had brought sugar, soap, and candles they would have acted like wise men."

What did happen to these gifts is never mentioned in the scripture, but several traditions have developed. One story has the gold being stolen by the two thieves who were later crucified alongside Jesus. Another tale has it being entrusted to and then misappropriated by Judas. Another story is that it was used to finance the family's flight to Egypt.

== Commentary from the Church Fathers ==
Pope Leo I: Though in stature a babe, needing the aid of others, unable to speak, and different in nothing from other infants, yet such faithful witnesses, showing the unseen Divine Majesty which was in Him, ought to have proved most certainly that that was the Eternal Essence of the Son of God that had taken upon Him the true human nature.

Pseudo-Chrysostom: Mary His mother, not crowned with a diadem or laying on a golden couch; but with barely one garment, not for ornament but for covering, and that such as the wife of a carpenter when abroad might have. Had they therefore come to seek an earthly king, they would have been more confounded than rejoiced, deeming their pains thrown away. But now they looked for a heavenly King; so that though they saw nought of regal state, that star's witness sufficed them, and their eyes rejoiced to behold a despised Boy, the Spirit showing Him to their hearts in all His wonderful power, they fell down and worshipped, seeing the man, they acknowledged the God.

Rabanus Maurus: Joseph was absent by Divine command, that no wrong suspicions might occur to the Gentiles.

Glossa Ordinaria: In these offerings we observe their national customs, gold, frankincense, and various spices abounding among the Arabians; yet they intended thereby to signify something in mystery.

Gregory the Great: Gold, as to a King; frankincense, as sacrifice to God; myrrh, as embalming the body of the dead.

Augustine: Gold, as paid to a mighty King; frankincense, as offered to God; myrrh, as to one who is to die for the sins of all.

Pseudo-Chrysostom: And though it were not then understood what these several gifts mystically signified, that is no difficulty; the same grace that instigated them to the deed, ordained the whole.

Saint Remigius: And it is to be known that each did not offer a different gift, but each one the three things, each one thus proclaiming the King, the God, and the man.

Chrysostom: Let Marcion and Paul of Samosata then blush, who will not see what the Magi saw, those progenitors of the Church adoring God in the flesh. That He was truly in the flesh, the swaddling clothes and the stall prove; yet that they worshipped Him not as mere man, but as God, the gifts prove which it was becoming to offer to a God. Let the Jews also be ashamed, seeing the Magi coming before them, and themselves not even earnest to tread in their path.

Gregory the Great: Something further may yet be meant here. Wisdom is typified by gold; as Solomon saith in the Proverbs, A treasure to be desired is in the mouth of the wise. (Prov. 21:20.) By frankincense, which is burnt before God, the power of prayer is intended, as in the Psalms, Let my speech come before thee as incense. (Ps. 141:2.) In myrrh is figured mortification of the flesh. To a king at his birth we offer gold, if we shine in his sight with the light of wisdom; we offer frankincense, if we have power before God by the sweet savour of our prayers; we offer myrrh, when we mortify by abstinence the lusts of the flesh.

Glossa Ordinaria: The three men who offer, signify the nations who come from the three-quarters of the earth. They open their treasures, i. e. manifest the faith of their hearts by confession. Rightly in the house, teaching that we should not vain-gloriously display the treasure of a good conscience. They bring three gifts, i. e. the faith in the Holy Trinity. Or opening the stores of Scripture, they offer its threefold sense, historical, moral, and allegorical; or Logic, Physic, and Ethics, making them all serve the faith.

| Preceded by Matthew 2:10 | Gospel of Matthew; Chapter 2 | Succeeded by Matthew 2:12 |
