= Matthew 2:9 =

- ← 2:8 2:10 →
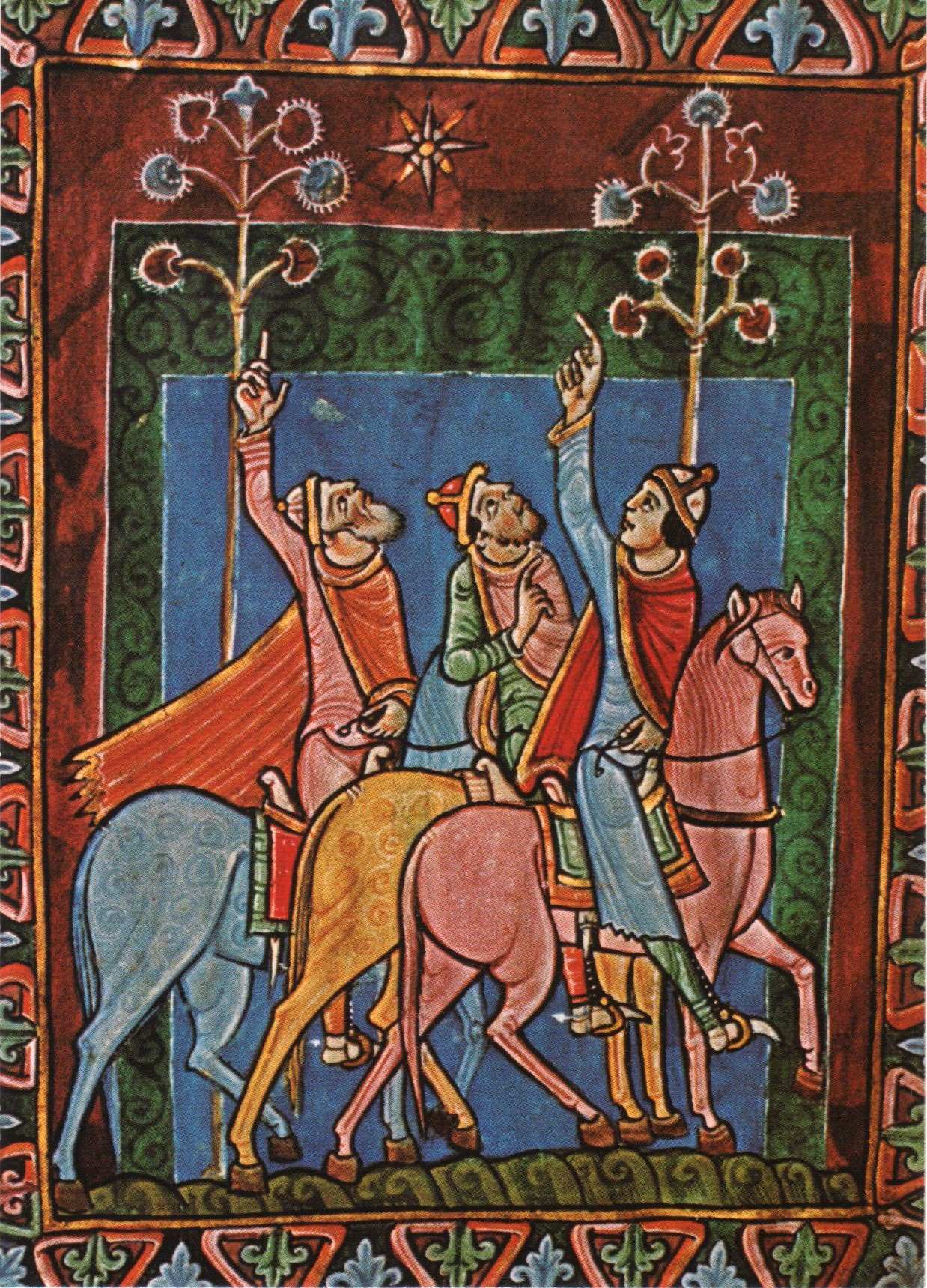
- St. Albans Psalter, The Three Magi following the star, 1140
- Book: Gospel of Matthew
- Christian Bible part: New Testament

Matthew 2:9 is the ninth verse of the second chapter of the Gospel of Matthew in the New Testament. King Herod has dispatched the magi to Bethlehem to find the infant Jesus. In this verse they follow the Star of Bethlehem to find the infant.

== Content ==
In the King James Version of the Bible the text reads:

When they had heard the king, they departed; and, lo, the
star, which they saw in the east, went before them, till
it came and stood over where the young child was.

The World English Bible translates the passage as:

They, having heard the king, went their way; and behold,
the star, which they saw in the east, went before them,
until it came and stood over where the young child was.

The Novum Testamentum Graece text is:

οἱ δὲ ἀκούσαντες τοῦ βασιλέως ἐπορεύθησαν
καὶ ἰδοὺ ὁ ἀστὴρ, ὃν εἶδον ἐν τῇ ἀνατολῇ, προῆγεν αὐτούς
ἕως ἐλθὼν ἐστάθη ἐπάνω οὗ ἦν τὸ παιδίον.

For a collection of other versions see BibleHub Matthew 2:9

== Analysis ==
Unlike the previous mention of the Star of Bethlehem this verse clearly indicates that it guided the magi to their destination. In combination with the next verse it seems to be clear that the star pointed out the specific house Jesus was in, or perhaps the entire village. How it did this is unspecified in the text, and artists have portrayed a wide array of means.

The phrase "went before" can mean either that the star was moving throughout their journey or that it remained stationary and served only as a fixed guide. However the phrase "came and stood" unambiguously means that it ceased moving and came to a rest at this point. Hill comments that the undeniably miraculous behaviour of the star in this verse defies all the various attempts to rationalize the star it as a natural nova or conjunction. This might be a reference to the pillar of cloud that guide the Israelites through the wilderness. Fortnas notes that the astronomical theory of the time thought of the stars a points of light moving along a fixed heavenly dome. This made it far easier to imagine a star stopping its motion.

It is unclear exactly how long after Jesus' birth the magi arrived. Traditionally they were seen to arrive at most a few days after the birth of Jesus as the Gospel of Luke has Jesus leaving for Jerusalem by the time he was forty days old from whence he went to Nazareth. This left a fairly brief window of time for the magi to visit him in Jerusalem, especially considering they needed time to travel from the east via Jerusalem. In this verse the author of Matthew refers to Jesus as a child rather than an infant, perhaps indicating that he was older. Another indication that Jesus was older is the fact in Scripture which points to Herod killing children 2-years old and younger. Today most scholars feel that Matthew probably meant that Jesus was several months old at the time the magi visited.

== Commentary from the Church Fathers ==
Pseudo-Chrysostom: This passage shows, that when the star had brought the Magi nearly to Jerusalem, it was hidden from them, and so they were compelled to ask in Jerusalem, where Christ should be born? and thus to manifest Him to them; on two accounts, first, to put to confusion the Jews, inasmuch as the Gentiles instructed only by sight of a star sought Christ through strange lands, while the Jews who had read the Prophets from their youth did not receive Him, though born in their country. Secondly, that the Priests, when asked where Christ should be born, might answer to their now condemnation, and while they instructed Herod, they were themselves ignorant of Him. The star went before them, to show them the greatness of the King.

Augustine: To perform its due service to the Lord, it advanced slowly, leading them to the spot. It was ministering to Him, and not ruling His fate; its light showed the suppliants and filled the inn, shed over the walls and roof that covered the birth; and thus it disappeared.

Pseudo-Chrysostom: What wonder that a divine star should minister to the Sun of righteousness about to rise. It stood over the Child's head, as it were, saying, ‘This is He;’ proving by its place what it had no voice to utter.

Glossa Ordinaria: It is evident that the star must have been in the air, and close above the house where the Child was, else it would not have pointed out the exact house.

Ambrose: The star is the way, and the way is Christ; and according to the mystery of the incarnation, Christ is a star. He is a blazing and a morning-star. Thus where Herod is, the star is not seen; where Christ is, there it is again seen, and points out the way.

Saint Remigius: Or, the star figures the grace of God, and Herod the Devil. He, who by sin puts himself in the Devil's power, loses that grace; but if he return by repentance, he soon finds that grace again which leaves him not till it have brought him to the young Child's house, i. e. the Church.

Glossa Ordinaria: Or, the star is the illumination of faith, which leads him to the nearest aid; while they turn aside to the Jews, the Magi lose it; so those who seek counsel of the bad, lose the true light.

== Resources ==
- Albright, W.F. and C.S. Mann. "Matthew." The Anchor Bible Series. New York: Doubleday & Company, 1971.
- Hill, David. The Gospel of Matthew. Grand Rapids: Eerdmans, 1981

Preceded by Matthew 2:8	Gospel of Matthew; Chapter 2	Succeeded by Matthew 2:10
