= Matthew 2:2 =

- ← 2:1 2:3 →
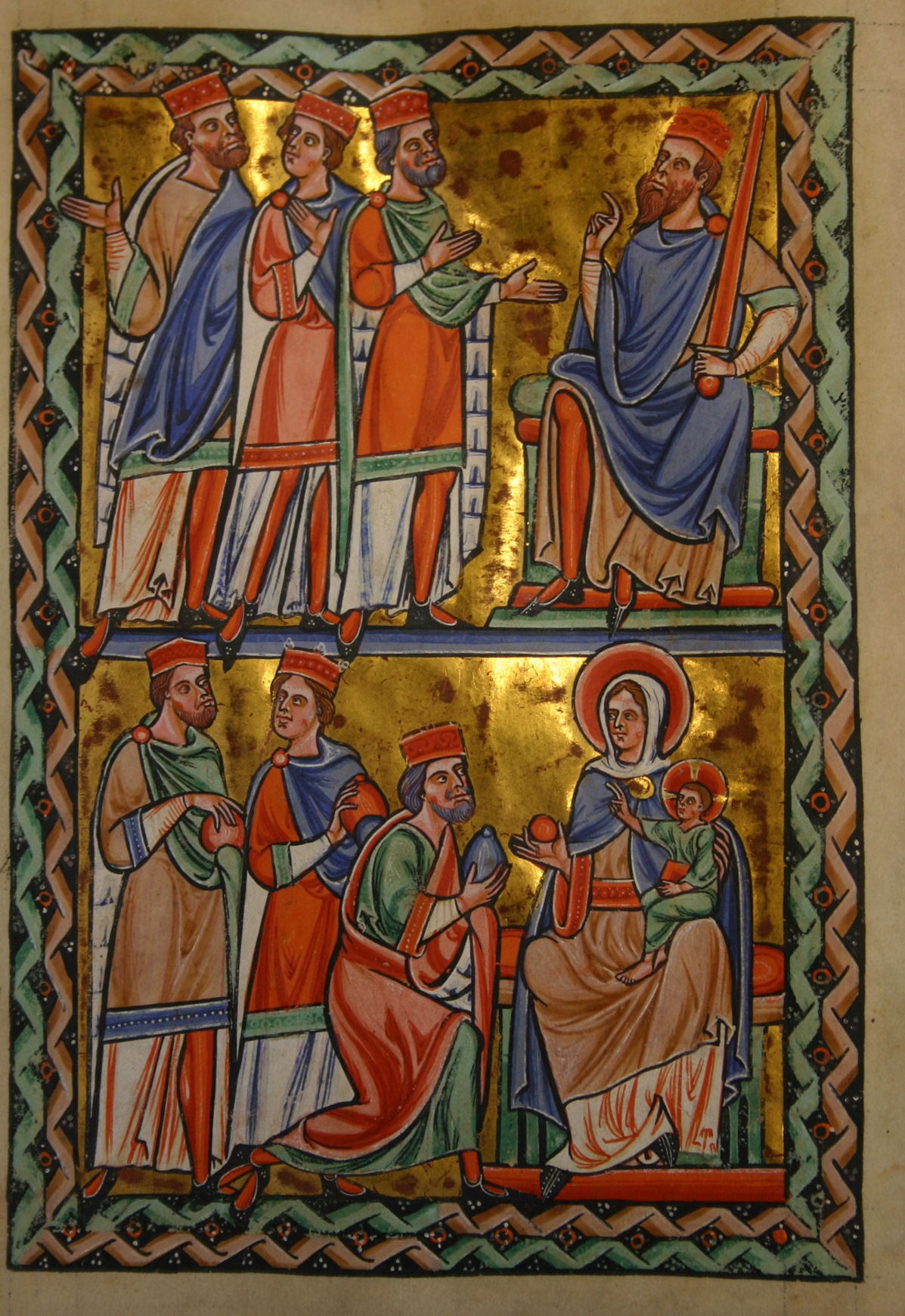
- The Magi before Herod in the Leiden St. Louis Psalter
- Book: Gospel of Matthew
- Christian Bible part: New Testament

Matthew 2:2 is the second verse of the second chapter of the Gospel of Matthew in the New Testament. The magi travelling from the east have arrived at the court of King Herod in Jerusalem and in this verse inform him of their purpose.

== Text ==
The original Koine Greek, according to Westcott and Hort, reads:

λεγοντες που εστιν ο τεχθεις βασιλευς των ιουδαιων ειδομεν γαρ
αυτου τον αστερα εν τη ανατολη και ηλθομεν προσκυνησαι αυτω

In the King James Version of the Bible the text reads:

Saying, Where is he that is born King of the Jews? for we
have seen his star in the east, and are come to worship him.

The World English Bible translates the passage as:

"Where is he who is born King of the Jews? For we saw his
star in the east, and have come to worship him."

The New International Version Copyright 2011, translates the passage as:

“Where is the one who has been born king of the Jews? We saw
his star when it rose and have come to worship him.”

For a collection of other versions see BibleHub Matthew 2:2.

The theme of World Youth Day 2005, "We have come to worship Him", is derived from this verse in the bible.

== The magi before Herod ==
Boring notes that where is the first word spoken aloud in the Gospel. Where will also be the first word spoken by Herod in Matthew 2:4. Throughout the early part of the gospel geography will be a central concern of Matthew, covered in far greater detail than in the other gospels. One theory is that Matthew is writing an apologetic for why the messiah comes from the small and unknown town in Nazareth in Gentile dominated Galilee. This is the only time in the chapter that Magi speak. Davies and Allison believe their general silence throughout the narrative helps maintain the travellers aura of mystery.

Albright and Mann mention but reject the theory that King of the Jews is an anachronism and at the time King of Israel or King of the Hebrews would have been a more likely title. They reject this theory saying that King Aristobulus used the title around 100 BC. Nolland notes that this inaccuracy might be reflective of the foreign nature of the Magi, who do not know the specific terminology to be used. The title is reused by a less knowledgeable foreigner in Matthew 27:11. The title is a direct challenge to Herod, who was renowned for his paranoia, as king of Judea. Herod as an Edomite would have been especially threatened by a Davidic heir.

The word worship, also often translated as "pay homage", proskunesai in the Greek, is a very popular one in Matthew. It can mean honouring either a king or a God, in this case which of the meanings is meant is not clear.

An early Pseudo-Chrysostom source writes, "Were these Magi ignorant that Herod reigned in Jerusalem? Or that it is a capital punishment to proclaim another King while one lives? But while they meditated on the coming King, they did not fear the current king. Having not seen Christ, they were ready to die for Him."

== Star of Bethlehem ==
The star referenced in this verse has come to be known as the Star of Bethlehem. Since at least Kepler there has been much work to try and link it to an astronomical event with the most common cited being a conjunction of Jupiter and Saturn in 7 BC. Since 1964 the astronomer Konradin Ferrari d'Occhieppo argued in several publications for this very seldom conjunction as having taken place in the year 7 BC. The phrase "seen his star in the east" is much disputed. Many scholars feel it should actually just read "seen his star rising". The Greek word in question is anatole, but its exact translation is unclear. It is likely a technical astrological term meaning rising. Its spelling is very close to the word for east, and this has become the standard translation. Fortna notes that it seems contradictory because a star rising to the east would then guide the magi westwards. Boring suggests that the verse could be read as the magi seeing the star rising when they were in the east.

John Chrysostom rejected the idea that the Star of Bethlehem was a normal star or similar heavenly body because such a star could not have specified the exact cave and manger where Jesus was found, being too high in the sky to be that specific. Also, he notes that stars in the sky move from east to west, but that the magi would have travelled from north to south to arrive in Palestine from Persia. Instead, Chrysostom suggested that the Star was a more miraculous occurrence, comparable to the pillar of cloud that led the Israelites out of Egypt through the wilderness.

At the time the notion of new stars as beacons of major events were common, being reported for such figures as Alexander the Great, Mithridates VI of Pontus, Abraham, and Augustus. Pliny even takes time to rebut a theory that every person has a star that rises when they are born and fades when they die, evidence that this was believed by some. According to Brown many at the time would have thought it unthinkable that a messiah would have been born without such stellar portents.

The reference to the star makes it likely the magi were astrologers. Some Christians have had difficulty with this as elsewhere in the Bible astrology is condemned, a view shared by most Christian churches. France argues that the passage is not an endorsement of astrology but rather an illustration of how God takes care in "meeting individuals where they are". Keener notes that astrology was ubiquitous in the Roman world of this period, and was also common among the Jews in Palestine. Matthew goes in no detail about the astrological nature of the magi and makes no judgments either for or against the practice. Nolland states "the interest is elsewhere" and the author of Matthew has no inclination to go into a detailed discussion of astrology.

== Commentary from the Church Fathers ==
Saint Remigius: Yet was not the Lord born there; thus they knew the time but not the place of His birth. Jerusalem being the royal city, they believed that such a child could not be born in any other. Or it was to fulfil that Scripture, The Law shall go out of Sion, and the word of the Lord from Jerusalem. (Isa. 2:3.) And there Christ was first preached. Or it was to condemn the backwardness of the Jews.

Gregory the Great: It should be known that the Priscillianists, heretics who believe every man to be born under the aspect of some planet, cite this text in support of their error; the new star which appeared at the Lord's birth they consider to have been his fate.

Augustine: And, according, to Faustus this introduction of the account of the star would lead us rather to call this part of the history, ‘The Nativity,’ than ‘The Gospel.’

Gregory the Great: But far be it from the hearts of the faithful to call anything, ‘fate.’

Augustine: For by the word ‘fate,’ in common acceptation, is meant the disposition of the stars at the moment of a person's birth or conception; to which some assign a power independent of the will of God. These must be kept at a distance from the ears of all who desire to be worshippers of Gods of any sort. But others think the stars have this virtue committed to them by the great God; wherein they greatly wrong the skies, in that they impute to their splendent host the decreeing of crimes, such as should any earthly people decree, their city should in the judgment of mankind deserve to be utterly destroyed.

Chrysostom: The object of astrology is not to learn from the stars the fact of one's birth; but from the hour of their nativity to forecast the fate of those that are born. But these men knew not the time of the nativity to have forecast the future from it, but the converse.

Glossa Ordinaria: ‘His star,’ i. e. the star He created for a witness of Himself.

Glossa Ordinaria: To the Shepherds, Angels, and the Magians, a star points out Christ; to both speaks the tongue of Heaven, since the tongue of the Prophets was mute. The Angels dwell in the heavens, the stars adorn it, to both therefore the heavens declare the glory of God.

Gregory the Great: To the Jews who used their reason, a rational creature, i. e. an Angel, ought to preach. But the Gentiles who knew not to use their reason are brought to the knowledge of the Lord, not by words, but by signs; to the one prophecy, as to the faithful; to the other signs, as to the unbelievers. One and the same Christ is preached, when of perfect age, by Apostles; when an infant, and not yet able to speak, is announced by a star to the Gentiles; for so the order of reason required; speaking preachers proclaimed a speaking Lord, mute signs proclaimed a mute infant.

Pope Leo I: Christ Himself, the expectation of the nations, that innumerable posterity once promised to the most blessed patriarch Abraham, but to be born not after the flesh, but by the Spirit; therefore likened to the stars for multitude, that from the father of all nations, not an earthly but an heavenly progeny might be looked for. Thus the heirs of that promised posterity, marked out in the stars, are roused to the faith by the rise of a new star, and where the heavens had been at first called in to witness, the aid of Heaven is continued.

Chrysostom: This was manifestly not one of the common stars of Heaven. First, because none of the stars moves in this way, from east to south, and such is the situation of Palestine with respect to Persia. Secondly, from the time of its appearance, not in the night only, but during the day. Thirdly, from its being visible and then again invisible; when they entered Jerusalem it hid itself, and then appeared again when they left Herod. Further, it had no stated motion, but when the Magi were to go on, it went before them; when to stop, it stopped like the pillar of cloud in the desert. Fourthly, it signified the Virgin's delivery, not by being fixed aloft, but by descending to earth, showing herein like an invisible virtue formed into the visible appearance of a star.

Saint Remigius: Some affirm this star to have been the Holy Spirit; He who descended on the baptized Lord as a dove, appearing to the Magi as a star. Others say it was an Angel, the same who appeared to the shepherds.

Glossa Ordinaria: In the east. It seems doubtful whether this refers to the place of the star, or of those that saw it; it might have risen in the east, and gone before them to Jerusalem.

Augustine: Will you ask, from whom had they learned that such an appearance as a star was to signify the birth of Christ? I answer from Angels, by the warning of some revelation. Do you ask, was it from good or ill Angels? Truly even wicked spirits, namely the dæmons, confessed Christ to be the Son of God. But why should they not have heard it from good Angels, since in this their adoration of Christ their salvation was sought, not their wickedness condemned? The Angels might say to them, ‘The Star which ye have seen is the Christ. Go ye, worship Him, where He is now born, and see how great is He that is born.’

Pope Leo I: Besides that star thus seen with the bodily eye, a yet brighter ray of truth pierced their hearts; they were enlightened by the illumination of the true faith.

Pope Leo I: What they knew and believed might have been sufficient for themselves, that they needed not to seek to see with the bodily eye, what they saw so clearly with the spiritual. But their earnestness and perseverance to see the Babe was for our profit. It profited us that Thomas, after the Lord's resurrection, touched and felt the marks of his wounds, and so for our profit the Magians’ eyes looked on the Lord in His cradle.

Pseudo-Chrysostom: Were they then ignorant that Herod reigned in Jerusalem? Or that it is a capital treason to proclaim another King while one yet lives? But while they thought on the King to come, they feared not the king that was; while as yet they had not seen Christ, they were ready to die for Him. O blessed Magi! who before the face of a most cruel king, and before having beheld Christ, were made His confessors.

Preceded by Matthew 2:1	Gospel of Matthew; Chapter 2	Succeeded by Matthew 2:3
