= Matthew 1:25 =

- ← 1:24 2:1 →
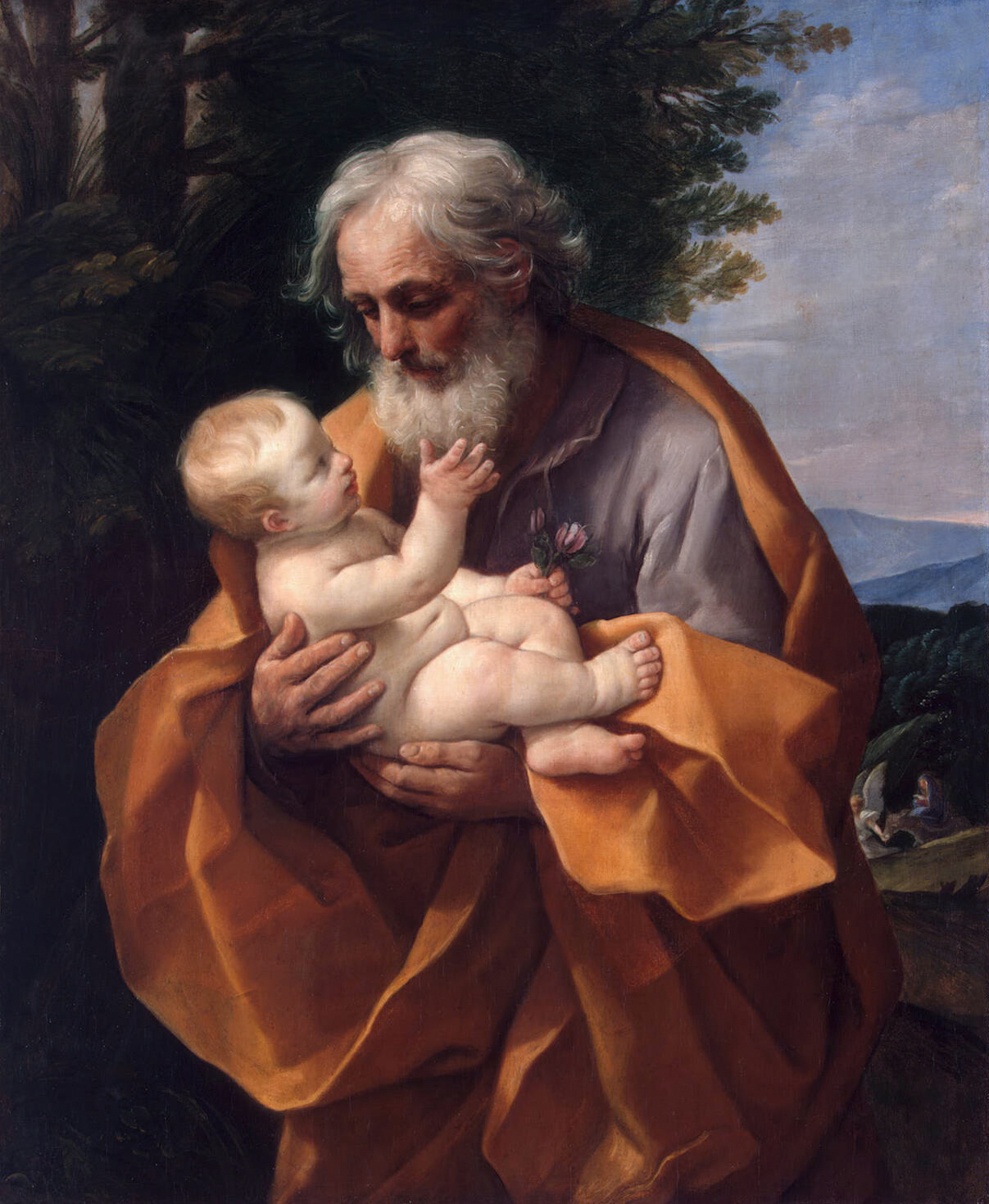
- Guido Reni's Joseph with the Infant Jesus
- Book: Gospel of Matthew
- Christian Bible part: New Testament

Matthew 1:25 is the twenty-fifth and final verse of the first chapter of the Gospel of Matthew in the New Testament. Joseph has awakened from a dream in which an angel gave him instructions about the birth of Jesus. He has taken Mary into his home, completing their marriage. In this verse, Jesus is born and his name is given to him by Joseph.

== Content ==
The original Koine Greek, according to Westcott and Hort, reads:

καὶ οὐκ ἐγίνωσκεν αὐτὴν ἕως οὗ ἔτεκεν
υἱόν· καὶ ἐκάλεσεν τὸ ὄνομα αὐτοῦ Ἰησοῦν

The Textus Receptus ("received text") adds after "υιον" the words "αυτης τον πρωτοτοκον". Heinrich Meyer suggests that "the Received reading has the appearance of having originated from Luke 2:7".

In the King James Version of the Bible, the text reads:

And knew her not till she had brought forth her firstborn
son and he called his name JESUS.

The World English Bible translates the passage as:

and didn't know her sexually until she had brought forth her
firstborn son. He named him Jesus.

For a collection of other versions see BibleHub Matthew 1:25.

== Analysis ==
Although Matthew 1:18 introduces the subject of the birth of Jesus, this verse contains Matthew's only reference to it taking place. As Matthew Poole observed, "we shall meet with more circumstances relating to the birth of Christ when we come to the two first chapters of Luke".

This verse suggests that Mary was a virgin at the time of Jesus' birth, and is cited as one of the scriptural evidences for the Virgin Birth. The word ἐγίνωσκεν literally translated "knew" refers often in the Bible to sexual relations. Eugene Boring says that in verses like this the author of the gospel seems to possess an extreme level of personal detail, while remarking that the command of the angel at Matthew 1:20 says nothing about avoiding sexual relations either before or after the birth of Jesus.

This passage is the centre of controversy over the perpetual virginity of Mary. To many Antidicomarians this verse is one of the central reasons for rejecting her perpetual virginity, seeing the author of Matthew, who states that sexual relations did not occur before the birth of Jesus, as implying that they occurred afterwards. Frederick Dale Bruner is one who interprets the word "until" as denoting that, after childbirth, "Joseph and Mary will live together completely as husband and wife." Grant R. Osborne writes that "the imperfect tense denotes that Joseph at no time had sexual intercourse with his wife "until" after the birth of Jesus." Presbyterian David Hill acknowledges that the wording does not absolutely deny Mary's perpetual virginity, but argues that if the idea of the perpetual virginity had been current at the time the gospel was written then the author of Matthew would have been more specific. On the other hand, Martin Luther always believed in the virginity of Mary even after giving birth to Jesus. Raymond E. Brown, a Roman Catholic, reports that K. Beyer states that in Greek and Semitic a negation until implies nothing about what happens afterwards; Brown himself says that Matthew is concerned only with stressing Mary's virginity at the time of giving birth to Jesus and not with what followed and he asks whether Matthew was in a position to know.

As reported in Luke 2:21, the child was named eight days after his birth at the time of the circumcision. The phrase "he was called" in the original Greek (ἐκλήθη) is in the passive voice. However, in Matthew 1:21 Joseph is told that he will do the naming, and Joseph names Jesus in verse 25, in obedience to the command of the angel. Robert H. Gundry believes that having Joseph name Jesus is a clear demonstration of Jesus' legal status as his son, and thus as an heir of King David, a continuation of the argument made by the genealogy.

== Commentary from the Church Fathers ==
Jerome: Helvidius is at much superfluous trouble to make this word know refer to carnal knowledge rather than to acquaintance, as though any had ever denied that; or as if the follies to which he replies had ever occurred to any person of common understanding. He then goes on to say, that the adverb ‘until’ denotes a fixed time when that should take place, which had not taken place before; so that here from the words, He knew her not until she had brought forth her first-born Son, it is clear, he says, that after that he did know her. And in proof of this he heaps together many instances from Scripture. To all this we answer, that the word ‘until’ is to be understood in two senses in Scripture. And concerning the expression, knew her not, he has himself shewn, that it must be referred to carnal knowledge, none doubting that it is often used of acquaintance, as in that, The child Jesus tarried behind in Jerusalem, and His parents knew not of it. (Luke 2:43.) In like manner ‘until’ often denotes in Scripture, as he has shewn, a fixed period, but often also an infinite time, as in that, Even to your old age I am He. (Isa. 46:4.) Will God then cease to be when they are grown old? Also the Saviour in the Gospel, Lo, I am with you always, even to the end of this world. (Mat. 28:20.) Will He then leave His disciples at the end of the world? Again, the Apostle says, He must reign till He has put His enemies under His feel. (1 Cor. 15:25.) Be it understood then, that that which if it had not been written might have been doubted of, is expressly declared to us; other things are left to our own understanding. So here the Evangelist informs us, in that wherein there might have been room for error, that she was not known by her husband until the birth of her Son, that we might thence infer that much less was she known afterwards.

Pseudo-Chrysostom: As one might say, ‘He told it not so long as he lived;’ would this imply that he told it after his death? Impossible. So it were credible that Joseph might have known her before the birth, while he was yet ignorant of the great mystery; but after that he understood how she had been made a temple of the Only-begotten of God, how could he occupy that? The followers of Eunomius think, as they have dared to assert this, that Joseph also dared to do it, just as the insane think all men equally mad with themselves.

Jerome: Lastly, I would ask, Why then did Joseph abstain at all up to the day of birth? He will surely answer, Because of the Angel's words, That which is born in her, &c. He then who gave so much heed to a vision as not to dare to touch his wife, would he, after he had heard the shepherds, seen the Magi, and known so many miracles, dare to approach the temple of God, the seat of the Holy Ghost, the Mother of his Lord?

Pseudo-Chrysostom: It may be said, that know here signifies simply, to understand; that whereas before he had not understood how great her dignity, after the birth he then knew that she had been made more honourable and worthy than the whole world, who had carried in her womb Him whom the whole world could not contain.

Epiphanius of Salamis: But in any case Joseph knew Mary, not with any knowledge of physical intimacy, not with the knowledge of intercourse—he knew her, and honored her whom God had honored. For he did not know how glorious she was until he saw the Lord who was born of a woman.

Hilary of Poitiers: As the Jews were not able to look upon and recognize the face of Moses on account of the rays of light which God had, as it were, breathed into him when He talked with him on Mount Sinai, so neither was Joseph able to look upon and to know the Blessed Virgin, forasmuch as she had God in her womb, and therefore her face was most radiant. But after Christ was born, this glory and effulgence left her face, and then she could be seen and known by Joseph.

Glossa Ordinaria: Otherwise; On account of the glorification of the most holy Mary, she could not be known by Joseph until the birth; for she who had the Lord of glory in her womb, how should she be known? If the face of Moses talking with God was made glorious, so that the children of Israel could not look thereon, how much more could not Mary be known, or even looked upon, who bare the Lord of glory in her womb? After the birth she was known of Joseph to the beholding of her face, but not to be approached carnally.

Jerome: From the words, her firstborn Son, some most erroneously suspect that Mary had other sons, saying that first-born can only be said of one that has brethren. But this is the manner of Scripture, to call the first-born not only one who is followed by brethren, but the first-birth of the mother.

Jerome: For if he only was first-born who was followed by other brethren, then no first-birth could be due to the Priests, till such time as the second birth took place.

Preceded by Matthew 1:24	Gospel of Matthew; Chapter 1	Succeeded by Matthew 2:1
