= Matthew 2:12 =

- ← 2:11 2:13 →
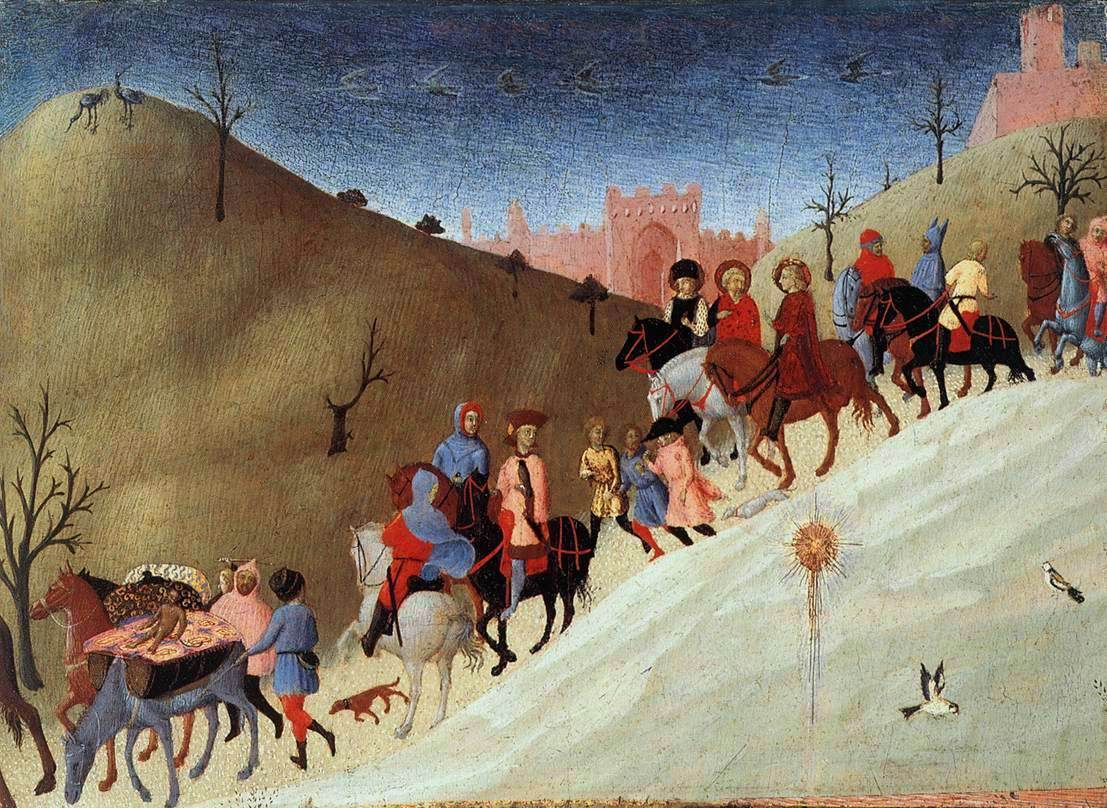
- The Magi as imagined by Sassetta in the 1430s.
- Book: Gospel of Matthew
- Christian Bible part: New Testament

Matthew 2:12 is the twelfth verse of the second chapter of the Gospel of Matthew in the New Testament. The magi, dispatched by King Herod, have found and paid homage to the Infant Jesus. In this verse this they return home rather than to Herod.

== Content ==
In the King James Version of the Bible the text reads:

And being warned of God in a
dream that they should not
return to Herod, they departed
into their own country another way.

The World English Bible translates the passage as:

Being warned in a dream
that they shouldn't return
to Herod, they went back to
their own country another way.

The Novum Testamentum Graece text is:

καὶ χρηματισθέντες κατ’ ὄναρ
μὴ ἀνακάμψαι πρὸς Ἡρῴδην
δι’ ἄλλης ὁδοῦ ἀνεχώρησαν εἰς τὴν χώραν αὐτῶν.

For a collection of other versions see BibleHub Matthew 2:12

== Analysis ==
That the Magi had no idea of Herod's malicious intentions, despite his reputation and the threat posed by a new king, is to Keener a sign of their innocent naivete and further contrast with Herod's malevolence.

Unlike in Matthew 1, no source of the dream is mentioned, but it likely meant to have come from the same angelic source as Joseph's dreams. In addition to astronomy, Magi were also well known as interpreters of dreams.

Returning a different way has often been seen as a metaphor for the effect finding Christ has on a person's life. Clarke notes that Gregory the Great commented that "having come to know Jesus we are forbidden to return by the way we came." F. Dale Bruner notes that the word way often has theological overtones in Matthew and that a reference to verses such as Matthew 7:13 and 7:14 that discuss the way of salvation might be implied.

At this point the magi leave the narrative and do not reappear. There are many traditional stories about what happened to them after this. One has them baptized by St. Thomas on his way to India. Another has their remains found by Saint Helena and brought to Constantinople. From there they eventually made their way to Germany and the Shrine of the Three Kings at Cologne Cathedral now reportedly holds their remains. Marco Polo in his writings claimed that he saw the perfectly preserved bodies of the three men in Saveh in Persia on his journeys.

Bruner notes that in this verse Matthew refers to just Herod not King Herod as earlier in the chapter. Herod is never again referred to as king in the chapter. Bruner speculates that the worship of the infant by the Magi had altered things and Herod had been supplanted as the true king.

For a discussion of what country they might be returning to see Matthew 2:2.

== Commentary from the Church Fathers ==
Augustine: The wicked Herod, now made cruel by fear, will needs do a deed of horror. But how could he ensnare him who had come to cut off all fraud? His fraud is escaped as it follows, And being warned.

Jerome: They had offered gifts to the Lord, and receive a warning corresponding to it. This warning (in the Greek ‘having received a response’) is given not by an Angel, but by the Lord Himself, to show the high privilege granted to the merit of Joseph.

Glossa Ordinaria: This warning is given by the Lord Himself; it is none other that now teaches these Magi the way they should return, but He who said, I am the way. Not that the Infant actually speaks to them, that His divinity may not be revealed before the time, and His human nature may be thought real. But he says, having received an answer, for as Moses prayed silently, so they with pious spirit had asked what the Divine will bade. By another way, for they were not to be mixed up with the unbelieving Jews.

Chrysostom: See the faith of the Magi; they were not offended, nor said within themselves, What need now of flight? or of secret return, if this Boy be really some great one? Such is true faith; it asks not the reason of any command, but obeys.

Pseudo-Chrysostom: Had the Magi sought Christ as an earthly King, they would have remained with Him when they had found Him; but they only worship, and go their way. After their return, they continued in the worship of God more steadfast than before, and taught many by their preaching. And when afterwards Thomas reached their country, they joined themselves to him, and were baptized, and did according to his preaching.

Gregory the Great: We may learn much from this return of the Magi another way. Our country is Paradise, to which, after we have come to the knowledge of Christ we are forbidden to return the way we came. We have left this country by pride, disobedience, following things of sight, tasting forbidden food; and we must return to it by repentance, obedience, by contemning things of sight, and overcoming carnal appetite.

Pseudo-Chrysostom: It was impossible that they, who left Herod to go to Christ, should return to Herod. They who have by sin left Christ and passed to the devil, often return to Christ; for the innocent, who knows not what is evil, is easily deceived, but having once tasted the evil he has taken up, and remembering the good he has left, he returns in penitence to God. He who has forsaken the devil and come to Christ, hardly returns to the devil; for rejoicing in the good he has found, and remembering the evil he has escaped, with difficulty returns to that evil.

== Bibliography ==
- Albright, W.F. and C.S. Mann. "Matthew." The Anchor Bible Series. New York: Doubleday & Company, 1971.
- Brown, Raymond E. The Birth of the Messiah: A Commentary on the Infancy Narratives in Matthew and Luke. London: G. Chapman, 1977.

Preceded by Matthew 2:11	Gospel of Matthew; Chapter 2	Succeeded by Matthew 2:13
