= Matthew 2:4 =

- ← 2:3 2:5 →
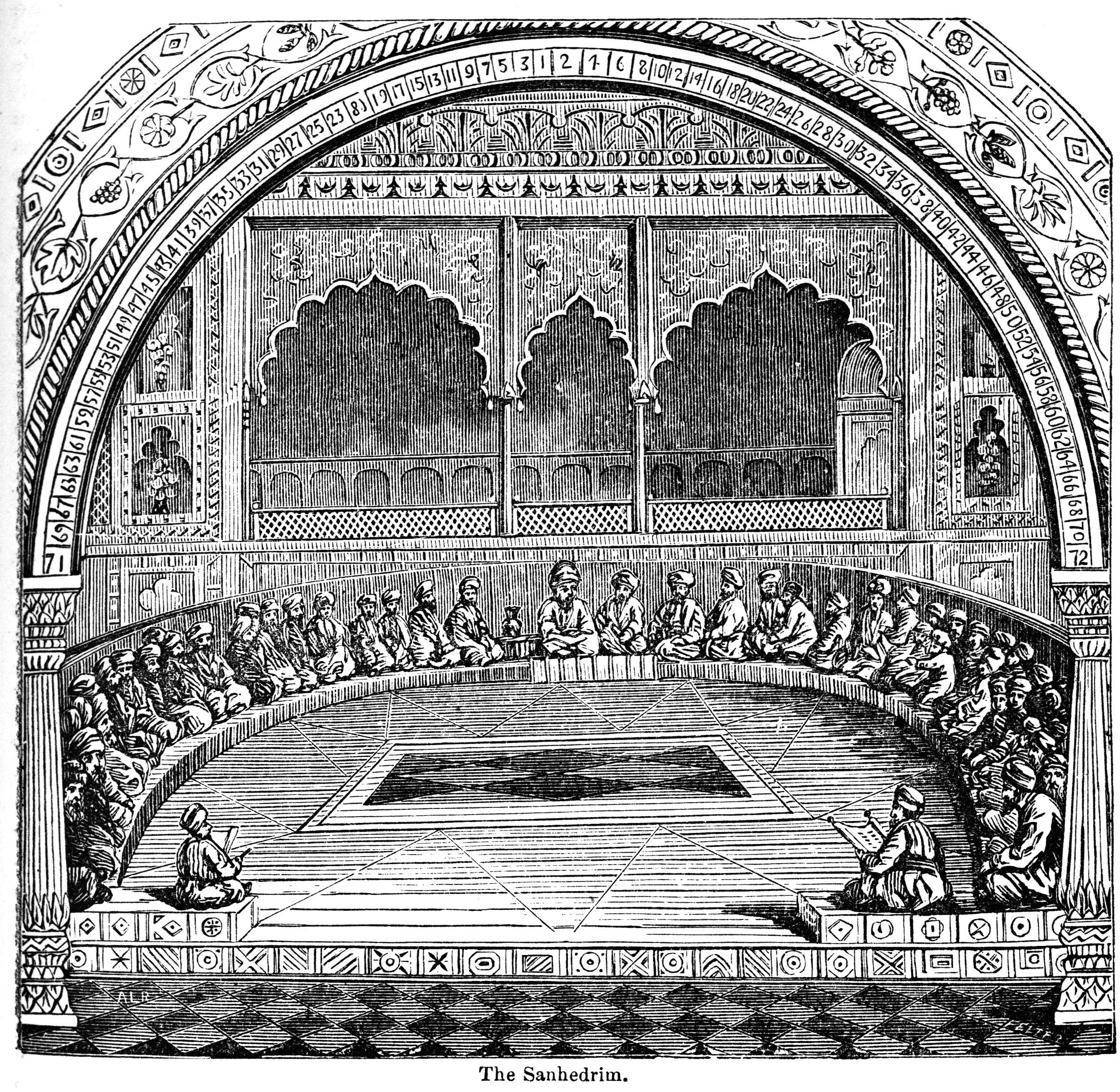
- A depiction of the Sanhedrin from an 1883 encyclopedia.
- Book: Gospel of Matthew
- Christian Bible part: New Testament

Matthew 2:4 is the fourth verse of the second chapter of the Gospel of Matthew in the New Testament. The magi have informed King Herod that they had seen portents showing the birth of the King of the Jews. In this verse he calls together leading figures of Jerusalem to find out where Jesus was to be born.

== Content ==
In the King James Version of the Bible the text reads:

And when he had gathered all the chief priests and scribes of the
people together, he demanded of them where Christ should be born.

The World English Bible translates the passage as:

Gathering together all the chief priests and scribes of
the people, he asked them where the Christ would be born. (Note: For a collection of other versions see BibleHub Matthew 2:4.)

The Novum Testamentum Graece text is:

καὶ συναγαγὼν πάντας τοὺς ἀρχιερεῖς καὶ γραμματεῖς τοῦ λαοῦ
ἐπυνθάνετο παρ’ αὐτῶν ποῦ ὁ Χριστὸς γεννᾶται.

== Analysis ==
Most scholars take the reference to "all the chief priests and scribes" as referring to the Sanhedrin, the council of leading religious figures that played an important role in governing. Some have argued that the phrase "all the chief priests" is incorrect as there was only one chief priest at the time. Brown notes that this phrase occurs in other contemporary documents and refers to the leading priests and also the former chief priests.

A more important difficulty with this passage is its historical implausibility. Records from that period show that Herod and the Sanhedrin were sharply divided and their relations acrimonious. Schweizer states that Herod calling and consulting with the council is "historically almost inconceivable". Schweizer believes that the introduction of the Jewish leaders is simply a device so that there will be someone to quote the Old Testament passage that appears in Matthew 2:6. As with the wording of the previous verse many scholars also see this linking of the Jewish leaders and Herod as an example of Christian anti-Semitism. Gundry agrees that the verse is politically motivated and a deliberate foreshadowing of the persecution of Jesus and his church by the leaders of Jerusalem. He notes that at the time the priest were largely Sadducees while the scribes were mostly Pharisees. Thus the specific mentioning of the two groups might be a deliberate attempt to tar both leading Jewish factions.

Also notable about this verse is that King Herod, who has only heard that the King of the Jews had been born, asks about the Christ, or the messiah.

That the magi, who first noted the star, do not know and are not even asked about where the messiah might be born is a sign that they are ignorant of Jewish scripture. This is evidence to Brown that they are Gentiles, which is also supported by verse 12's suggestion that they were foreigners: "And being warned of God in a dream that they should not return to Herod, they departed into their own country another way." John Chrysostom believed that they were from Persia.

== Commentary from the Church Fathers ==
Saint Remigius: They are called Scribes, not from the employment of writing, but from the interpretation of the Scriptures, for they were doctors of the law. Observe, he does not enquire where Christ is born, but where He should be born; the subtle purpose of this was to see if they would show pleasure at the birth of their King. He calls Him Christ, because he knew that the King of the Jews was anointed.

Pseudo-Chrysostom: Why does Herod make this enquiry, seeing he believed not the Scriptures? Or if he did believe, how could he hope to be able to kill Him whom the Scriptures declared should be King? The Devil instigated him, who believed that Scripture lies not; such is the faith of devils, who are not permitted to have perfect belief, even of that which they do believe. That they do believe, it is the force of truth constrains them; that they do not believe, it is that they are blinded by the enemy. If they had perfect faith, they would live as about to depart from this world soon, not as to possess it forever.

== Notes ==
Preceded by Matthew 2:3	Gospel of Matthew; Chapter 2	Succeeded by Matthew 2:5
