= Matthew 2:1 =

- ← 1:25 2:2 →
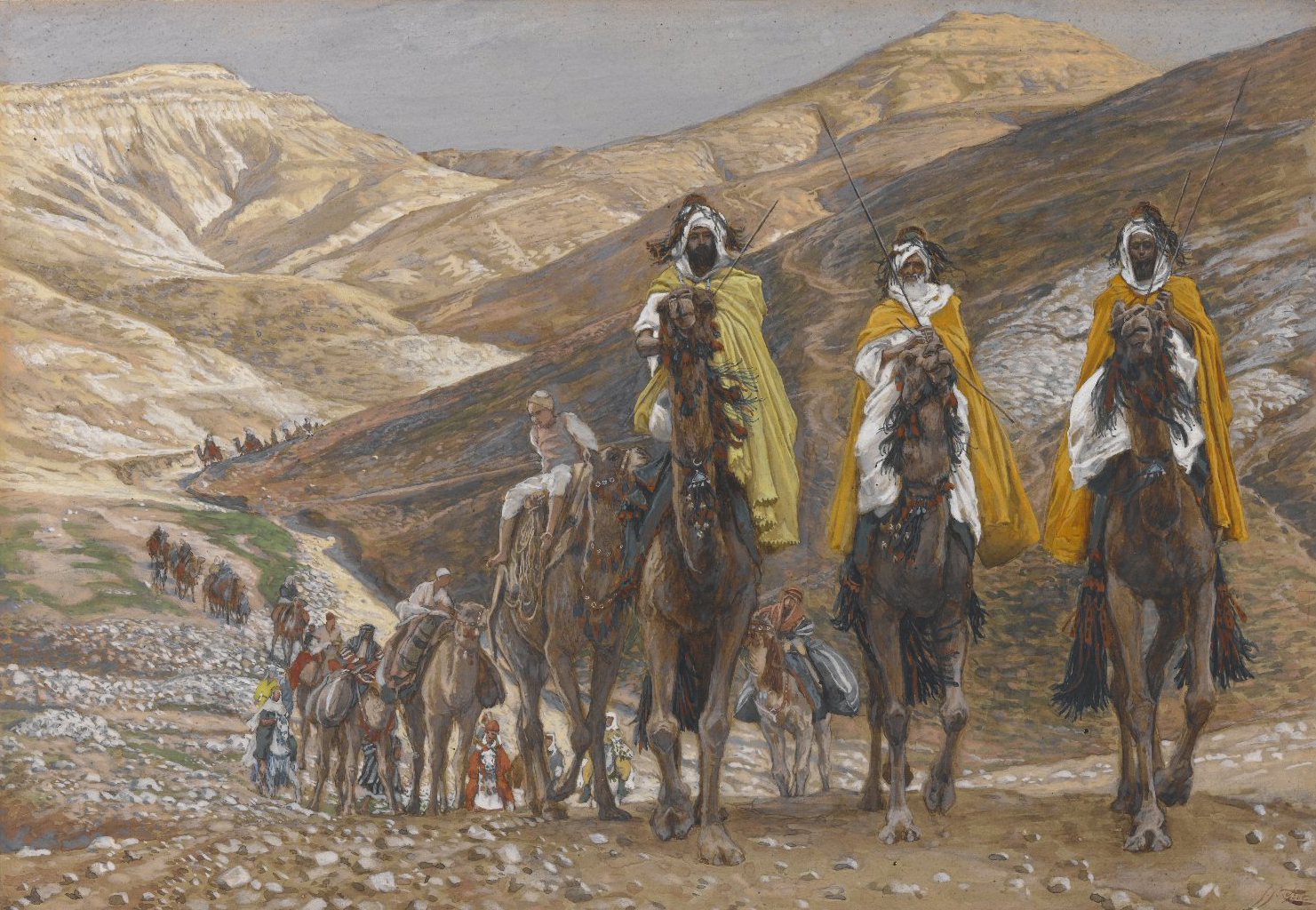
- James Tissot - The Magi Journeying (Les rois mages en voyage) - Brooklyn Museum
- Book: Gospel of Matthew
- Christian Bible part: New Testament

Matthew 2:1 is the first verse of the second chapter of the Gospel of Matthew in the New Testament. The previous verse ends with Jesus being named by his father. This verse marks the clear start of a new narrative, although the use of a quotation from Isaiah 7:14 in Matthew 1:23 is also reflected in the use of four Old Testament quotations in chapter 2.

This verse deals with the journey of the magi to the court of Herod the Great in Jerusalem after the birth of Jesus. This story of the magi continues until Matthew 2:12.

== Content ==
The original Koine Greek, according to Westcott and Hort, reads:

του δε ιησου γεννηθεντος εν βηθλεεμ της ιουδαιας εν ημεραις ηρωδου
του βασιλεως ιδου μαγοι απο ανατολων παρεγενοντο εις ιεροσολυμα

The use of Greek: δέ (de, now) in the opening words of this verse creates a continuative effect, leading directly on from the birth of the child to another connected history.

In the King James Version of the Bible, the text reads:

Now when Jesus was born in Bethlehem of Judaea in the days of
Herod the king, behold, there came wise men from the east to Jerusalem,

The New International Version translates the passage as:

After Jesus was born in Bethlehem in Judea, during the time
of King Herod, Magi from the east came to Jerusalem.

For a collection of other versions see BibleHub Matthew 2:1.

== Birth of Jesus ==
Matthew's account of the actual birth of Jesus is limited to Matthew 1:25 and this verse. Unlike Luke's Gospel, Matthew's narrative pays very little attention to this event, focusing far more on what occurred beforehand and afterwards.

== Bethlehem ==
This is the first point in the Gospel at which Bethlehem is mentioned. That it is specified as being "in Judea" is ascribed by Albright and Mann to the need to distinguish it from another Bethlehem in Zebulun, likely the modern town of Beit Lahna. Other scholars feel it is also to assert that Jesus was born in the heart of Judaism and also a link to the Old Testament figure Judas or Judah.

Jesus being born in Bethlehem is important to both Matthew and Luke, but it links especially closely to the genealogy in Matthew 1. The genealogy focuses on how Jesus was the heir to King David. David was born in Bethlehem and Jesus being born here cemented his role as the Davidic heir. Having him born in Bethlehem was also important as it is believed that critics attacked Jesus' origin in the minor and peripheral town of Nazareth.

"Herod the King" is accepted to refer to Herod the Great who ruled from around 47 BC and most likely died in 4 BC, but maybe lasted until 2 or 1 BC. All of these numbers seem to contradict Luke 2:1, which mentions a Roman census, and Luke 2:2, which states that Quirinius was governor of Syria. Luke thus seems to place Jesus' birth after 6 AD. That Matthew has Jesus' birth in the years BC is not a Biblical error. Rather it is attributed to Dionysius Exiguus who guessed incorrectly about when to start his calendar.

== Arrival of the magi ==
The word magi originally referred to Zoroastrian priests in Persia, but by the time this gospel was written it had come to mean anyone who dabbled in the occult arts such as magic, astrology, and dream interpretation. Since the chapter later refers to their interest in stars it is likely magi here refers to astrologers. The KJV translation as "wise men" is considered by modern scholars as quite inaccurate, mostly motivated by the desire not to imply any support for the arcane arts. Matthew never says how many magi there are, just that there are more than one. Traditions such as the magi being kings and having names developed later. There are many different translations of the word found, such as "wise men" and "astrologers". The only other place the word occurs in the New Testament is at Acts 13:6 and Acts 13:8. The magi in question is a negative figure and the word is more often translated as magician or sorcerer.

The phrase "from the east" is the only information Matthew provides on where the magi came from. Many scholars have theorized about where this east might be. Traditionally the view developed that the magi were Persian or Parthian, and artworks generally depict them in Persian dress. The main support for this is that the first magi were from Persia and that land still had the largest number of them. The interest in astronomy leads some to believe they were from Babylon, which was the centre of astrology at the time. The oldest attested theory, dating from 160 AD, is that they were from Arabia. This fits with the gifts they brought, which come from that part of the world. Brown comments that the author of Matthew probably didn't have a specific location in mind and the phrase "from the east" is for literary effect and added exoticism. Dale Allison connects the magi with the prophet Balaam, who was also "from the mountains of the east".

Saint Remigius states that "opinions vary with respect to the Magi. Some say they were Chaldæans, who are known to have worshipped a star as God, and by their fictitious god were shown the way to the true God. Others suppose they were Persians, while others state that they came from the ends of the world. The most probable opinion is, that they were descendants of Balaam, who had the prophecy, There will rise a Star out of Jacob, (Numb. 24:17.). Once they saw the star they knew a King was born."

Augustine comments on the coming of the Magi, saying, "Jesus then was manifested neither to the learned nor the righteous. Because ignorance belonged to the shepherds, impiety to the idolatrous Magi. Still, that Cornerstone attracted them both to Itself, for He came to choose the foolish things of this world to confound the wise, and He came not to call the righteous, but sinners, in order that nothing great should exalt itself, none weak should despair."

== Commentary from the Church Fathers ==
Augustine: After the miraculous Virgin-birth, a God-man having by Divine power proceeded from a virgin womb; in the obscure shelter of such a cradle, a narrow stall, wherein lay Infinite Majesty in a body more narrow, a God was suckled and suffered the wrapping of vile rags—amidst all this, on a sudden, a new star shone in the sky upon the earth, and driving away the darkness of the world, changed night into day; that the day-star should not be hidden by the night. Hence it is that the Evangelist says, Now when Jesus was born in Bethlehem.

Saint Remigius: In the beginning of this passage of the Gospel he puts three several things; the person, When Jesus was born, the place, in Bethlehem of Judæa, and the time, in the days of Herod the king. These three circumstances verify his words.

Jerome: We think the Evangelist first wrote, as we read in the Hebrew, ‘Judah,’ not ‘Judæa.’ For in what other country is there a Bethlehem, that this needs to be distinguished as in ‘Judæa?’ But ‘Judah’ is written, because there is another Bethlehem in Galilee.

Glossa Ordinaria: (ord. Josh. 19:15.) There are two Bethlehems; one in the tribe of Zabulon, the other in the tribe of Judah, which was before called Ephrata.

Augustine: Concerning the place, Bethlehem, Matthew and Luke agree; but the cause and manner of their being there, Luke relates, Matthew omits. Luke again omits the account of the Magi, which Matthew gives.

Pseudo-Chrysostom: Let us see to what serves this designation of time. In the days of Herod the king. It shows the fulfilment of Daniel's prophecy, wherein he spake that Christ should be born after seventy weeks of years. For from the time of the prophecy to the reign of Herod, the years of seventy weeks were accomplished. Or again, as long as Judæa was ruled by Jewish princes, though sinners, so long prophets were sent for its amendment; but now, whereas God's law was held under the power of an unrighteous king, and the righteousness of God enslaved by the Roman rule, Christ is born; the more desperate sickness required the better physician.

Rabanus Maurus: Otherwise, he mentions the foreign king to show the fulfilment of the prophecy. The Sceptre shall not depart from Judah, nor a Lawgiver from between his feet, until Shiloh come. (Gen. 49:10.)

Ambrose: It is said, that some Idumæan robbers coming to Ascalon, brought with them among other prisoners Antipatera. He was instructed in the law and customs of the Jews, and acquired the friendship of Hyrcanus, king of Judæa, who sent him as his deputy to Pompey. He succeeded so well in the object of his mission, that he laid claim to a share of the throne. He was put to death, but his son Herod was under Antony appointed king of Judæa, by a decree of the Senate; so it is clear that Herod sought the throne of Judæa without any connection or claim of birth.

Chrysostom: Herod the king, mentioning his dignity, because there was another Herod who put John to death.

Pseudo-Chrysostom: When He was born ... behold wise men, that is, immediately on His birth, showing that a great God existed in a little one of man.

Rabanus Maurus: The Magi are men who enquire into the nature of things philosophically, but common speech uses Magi for wizards. In their own country, however, they are held in other repute, being the philosophers of the Chaldæans, in whose lore kings and princes of that nation are taught, and by which themselves knew the birth of the Lord.

Augustine: What were these Magi but the first fruits of the Gentiles? Israelitish shepherds, gentile Magians, one from far, the other from near, hastened to the one Corner-stone.

Augustine: Jesus then was manifested neither to the learned nor the righteous; for ignorance belonged to the shepherds, impiety to the idolatrous Magi. Yet does that Corner-stone attract them both to Itself, seeing He came to choose the foolish things of this world to confound the wise, and not to call the righteous, but sinners; that nothing great should exalt himself, none weak should despair.

Glossa Ordinaria: These Magi were kings, and though their gifts were three, it is not to be thence inferred that themselves were only three in number, but in them was prefigured the coming to the faith of the nations sprung from the three sons of Noah. Or, the princes were only three, but each brought a large company with him. They came not after a year's end, for He would then have been found in Egypt, not in the manger, but on the thirteenth day. To show whence they came it is said, from the East.

Saint Remigius: It should be known, that opinions vary respecting the Magi. Some say they were Chaldæans, who are known to have worshipped a star as God; thus their fictitious Deity showed them the way to the true God. Others think that they were Persians; others again, that they came from the utmost ends of the earth. Another and more probable opinion is, that they were descendants of Balaam, who having his prophecy, There shall rise a Star out of Jacob, (Numb. 24:17.) as soon as they saw the star, would know that a King was born.

== See also ==
- The Journey of the Magi
- Three Wise Men

Preceded by Matthew 1:25	Gospel of Matthew; Chapter 2	Succeeded by Matthew 2:2
