= Johannes Teutonicus =

Johannes Teutonicus may refer to:

- Johannes Teutonicus Zemeke (d. 1245), glossator on the Decretum Gratiani
- John of Wildeshausen, called Johannes Teutonicus (ca. 1180–1252), master general of the Dominican order
