= Glossa ordinaria (disambiguation) =

Glossa Ordinaria (Latin for 'ordinary' or 'standard gloss') is a 12th-century collection of biblical commentaries in the form of glosses.

Glossa ordinaria may also refer to:

- Glossa ordinaria (Andreæ), a 13th-century collection of annotations to the Constitutiones Clementinae by Giovanni d'Andrea
- Glossa ordinaria (Accursius), a 13th-century collection of annotations to the Corpus Iuris Civilis by Accursius
- Glossa ordinaria (Botone), a 13th-century collection of annotations to the Decretals of Gregory IX by Bernard of Botone
- Glossa ordinaria (Zemeke), a 13th-century collection of annotations to the Decretum Gratiani by Johannes Teutonicus Zemeke
