= Matthew 2:8 =

- ← 2:7 2:9 →
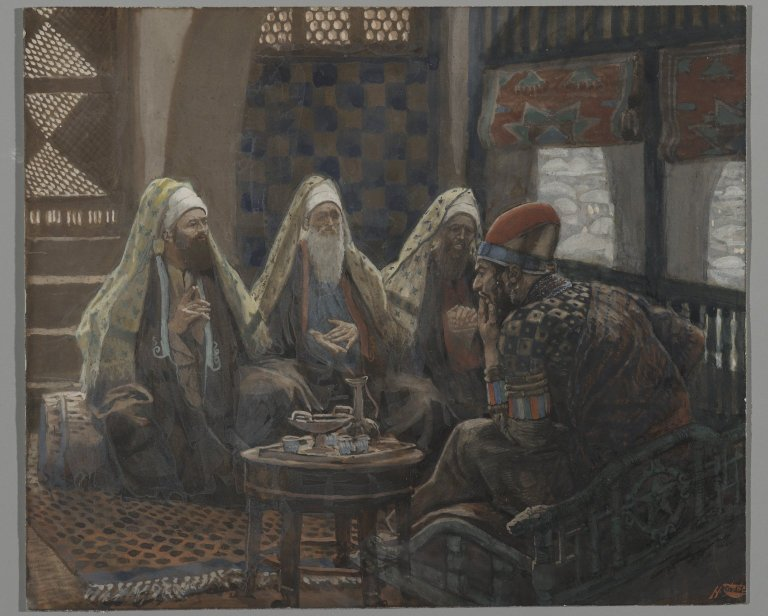
- The Magi in the House of Herod. Painting by James Tissot (1836–1902)
- Book: Gospel of Matthew
- Christian Bible part: New Testament

Matthew 2:8 is the eighth verse of the second chapter of the Gospel of Matthew in the New Testament. The magi have informed King Herod that they had seen portents showing the birth of the King of the Jews. After consulting with the leading Jewish religious figures Herod sends the magi to find the infant.

== Content ==
In the King James Version of the Bible the text reads:

And he sent them to Bethlehem, and said, Go and search
diligently for the young child; and when ye have found him,
bring me word again, that I may come and worship him also.

The World English Bible translates the passage as:

He sent them to Bethlehem, and said, "Go and search
diligently for the young child. When you have found
him, bring me word, so that I also may come and worship him."

The Novum Testamentum Graece text is:

καὶ πέμψας αὐτοὺς εἰς Βηθλεὲμ εἶπεν
Πορευθέντες ἐξετάσατε ἀκριβῶς περὶ τοῦ παιδίου
ἐπὰν δὲ εὕρητε, ἀπαγγείλατέ μοι, ὅπως κἀγὼ ἐλθὼν προσκυνήσω αὐτῷ.

For a collection of other versions see BibleHub Matthew 2:8.

== Analysis ==
Many scholars, such as Brown and Schweizer, find this passage improbable. Bethlehem is only five miles from Jerusalem and it is thus odd that Herod needs to use foreign magi who he had just met for such an important task. Schweizer comments on how odd it is that the deeply suspicious Herod places his absolute trust in the magi. France defends the historicity of this story. He theorizes that Herod decided not to use soldiers as they would alarm the villagers and make it difficult to find the infant. Also any soldiers or others close to Herod would have known very well why they were hunting the infant King of the Jews and may have balked at killing the potential messiah. The magi as foreigners and gentiles might have been more likely to trust Herod and have had fewer qualms if they did suspect him.

== Commentary from the Church Fathers ==
Pseudo-Chrysostom: To induce them to do this, he put on the colour of devotion, beneath which he whetted the sword, hiding the malice of his heart under the colour of humility. Such is the manner of the malicious, when they would hurt anyone in secret, they feign meekness and affection.

Gregory the Great: He feigns a wish of worshipping Him only that he may discover Him, and put Him to death.

Preceded by Matthew 2:7	Gospel of Matthew; Chapter 2	Succeeded by Matthew 2:9
