= Matthew 2 =

- ← chapter 1 chapter 3 →
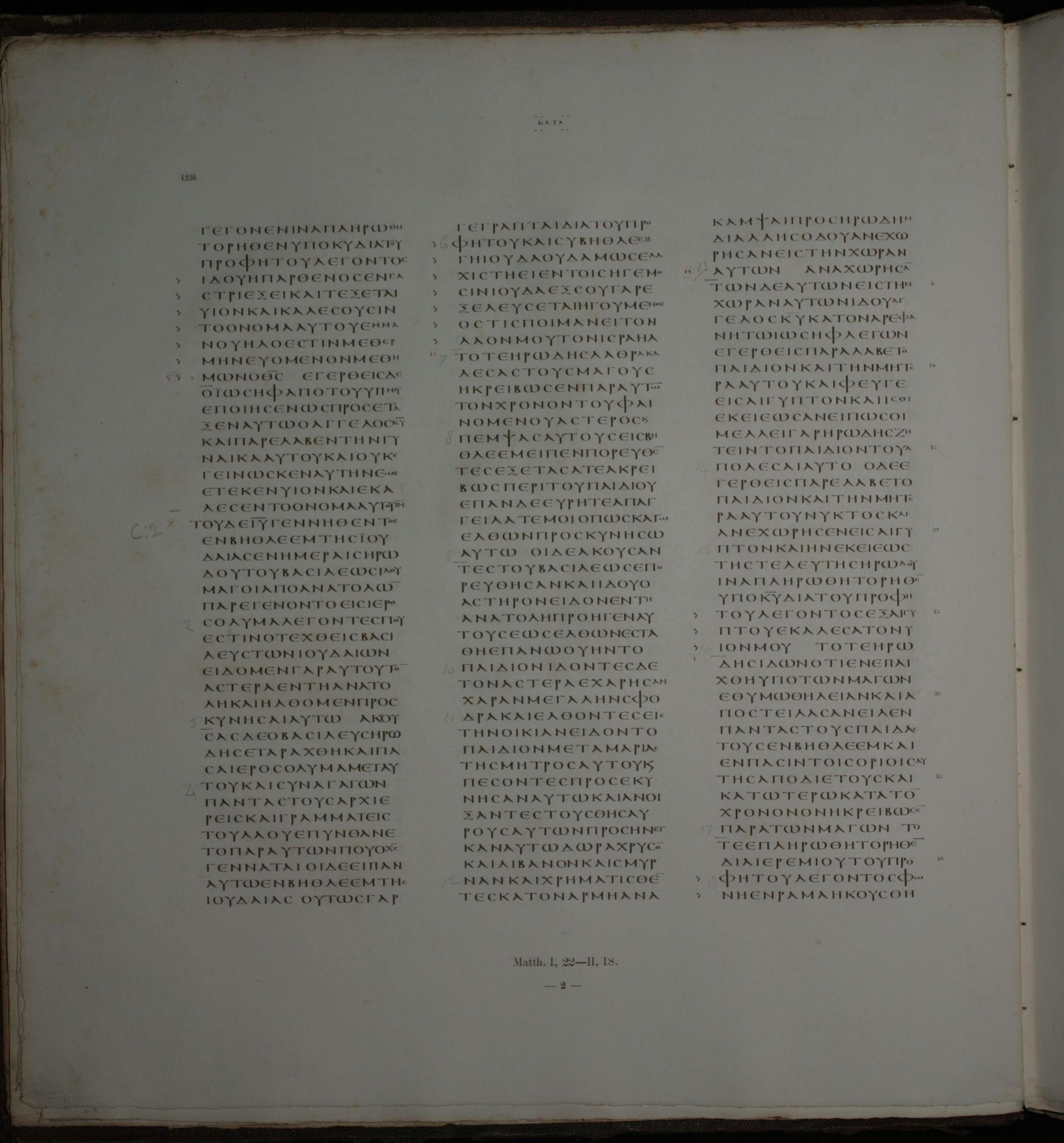
- Gospel of Matthew 1:22–2:18 on Codex Vaticanus, written about AD 325–350
- Book: Gospel of Matthew
- Category: Gospel
- Christian Bible part: New Testament
- Order in the Christian part: 1

Matthew 2 is the second chapter of the Gospel of Matthew in the New Testament. It describes the events after the birth of Jesus, the visit of the magi and the attempt by King Herod to kill the infant messiah, Joseph and his family's flight into Egypt, and their later return to live in Israel, settling in Nazareth.

== Text ==
The original text was written in Koine Greek. This chapter is divided into 23 verses.

=== Textual witnesses ===
Some early manuscripts containing the text of this chapter are: (Note: The extant Codex Alexandrinus does not contain this chapter due to lacuna.)

- Codex Vaticanus (~325–350; complete)
- Codex Sinaiticus (~330–360; complete)
- Codex Washingtonianus (~400)
- Codex Bezae (~400; complete)
- Codex Ephraemi Rescriptus (~450; complete)

== Analysis ==
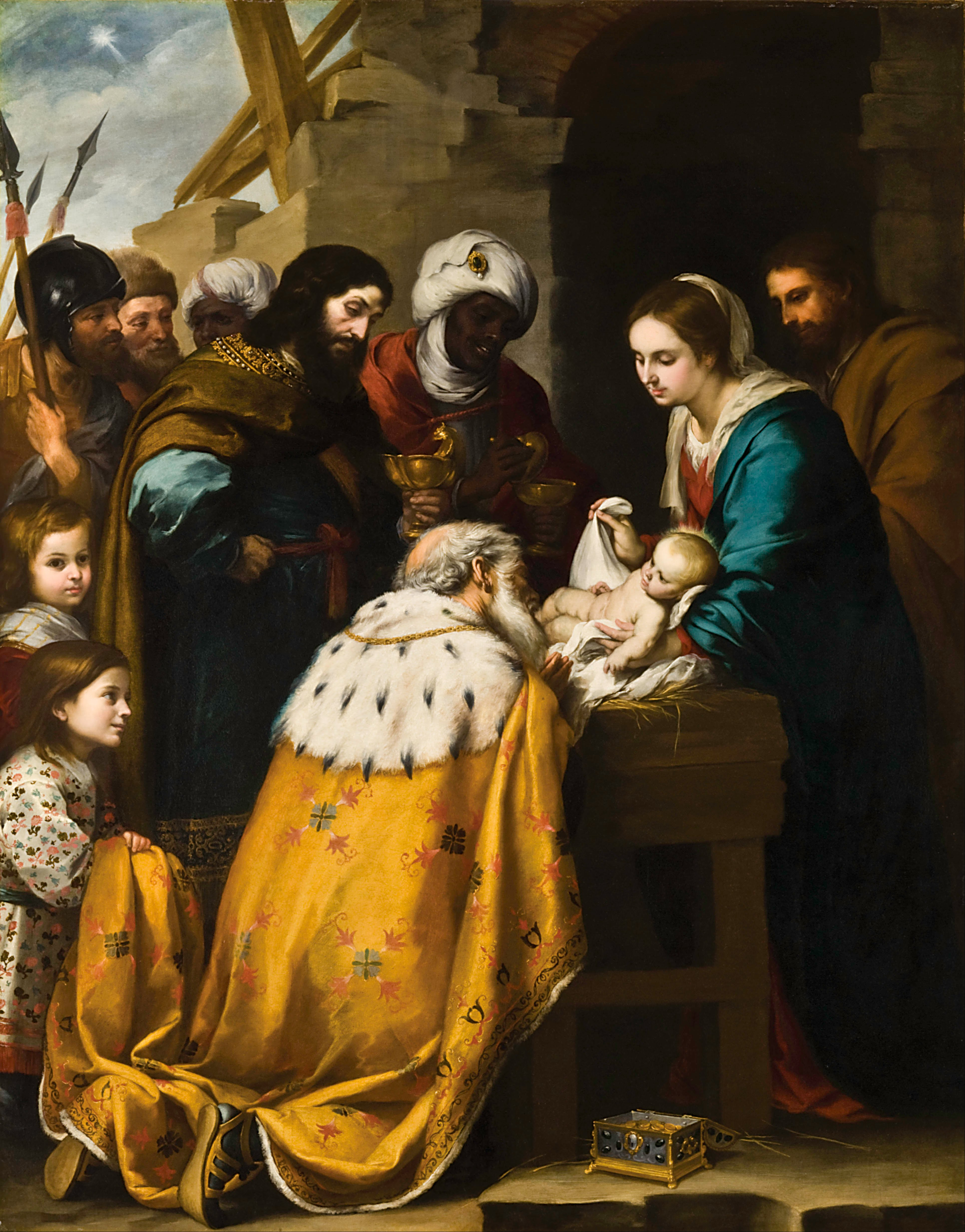
The Adoration of the Magi by Bartolomé Estéban Murillo

The infancy narrative of Jesus in the Gospel of Matthew has some parallels with the story of Moses's infancy in Jewish literature and the writings of Josephus, as in the table below.

Narrative in Matthew	Source	Narrative related to Moses	Source
Joseph's contemplation about Mary's pregnancy	Matthew 1:18–25	Amram's contemplation about his wife's pregnancy	Josephus, Antiquities of the Jews 2.210-216
Joseph was told that Jesus will be savior of his people from sins	Matthew 1:21	Moses was destined to be savior of his people	Josephus, Antiquities of the Jews 2:228; b. Sot.a 12b
Herod learned about the birth of Israel's liberator from scribes	Matthew 2:4–6	Pharaoh learned about the birth of Israel's liberator from scribes or magicians	Josephus, Antiquities of the Jews 2:205, 234; Jerusalem Targum on Exodus 1:15
Herod then ordered the slaughter of infants in Bethlehem	Matthew 2:16–18	Pharaoh then ordered the slaughter of male Hebrew children	Exodus 1:22

This chapter consists of four sections, each of which refers to a quotation from the Old Testament which Matthew sees Jesus fulfilling:

1. Micah 5:2 –"And you, Bethlehem ..."
2. Hosea 11:1 – "I called my son out of Egypt"
3. Jeremiah 31:15 – "A voice was heard in Ramah, lamentation and bitter weeping, Rachel weeping for her children, refusing to be comforted for her children, because they are no more"
4. "He shall be called a Nazarene" – Matthew's text states that these words were "spoken by the prophets", but "it is not clear which prophetic oracles Matthew alludes to".

The last portion of Matthew 1 is similarly written, with a quotation from Isaiah 7:14, and is often seen as part of this same section. Theologian Krister Stendahl notes that each of the four quotes in this chapter contain place names, and sees this entire chapter as apologetics for why the messiah moved from the important centre of Bethlehem to the minor one of Nazareth.

R.T. France notes that the Old Testament quotations in this chapter are "notoriously obscure and unconvincing". Many of them are heavily modified from the originals, with some passages being reversed in meaning. Almost all of them are taken out of context, and presented as prophecy when they were not in the original. The most confusing is that cited in Matthew 2:23, which does not appear anywhere in the Old Testament. Jerome associates it with Isaiah 11:1, where the etymology of Nazareth is derived from the Hebrew word for branch (ne'tser). That the quotations have been so contorted to fit the narrative, is to France and others, clear evidence that the narrative came first, and the quotations were added after. The author of Matthew firmly believed in the accuracy of the narrative they were recording, and would not alter it to make it better fit the prophecies.

As with Matthew 1 most scholars see this chapter as geared towards proving that Jesus is the messiah who was foretold by the prophets. The chapter contains five references to the Old Testament, a greater density than anywhere else in the New Testament. The author of Matthew uses them to try to demonstrate that Jesus matches the predictions of the prophets. Schweizer sees the chapter as being divided into five subsections, each ending with an Old Testament quotation. As with the genealogy of Matthew 1 many scholars feel that this chapter is trying to portray Jesus as the culmination of Jewish history with the author of Matthew relating events in Jesus' life to important ones in history. The author of Matthew is paralleling Exodus in this chapter with Jesus as Moses and Herod as Pharaoh. The Gospel also takes care to mention a sojourn by the Holy Family in Egypt that is mentioned nowhere else. Through a quote from Jeremiah (31:15), the Massacre of the Innocents is linked to the Babylonian Captivity, and Jesus being born in Bethlehem echoes King David who was also born in that village.

J. D. Kingsbury also sees this chapter as an exercise in apologetics with the cooperation of the chief priests and scribes with Herod, as described in Matthew 2:3 and Matthew 2:4, as prefiguring how the Jews and Gentiles will later respond to Christianity. American theologian Robert H. Gundry notes that persecution is an important theme of Matthew, who was writing at a time when a number of forces were working to crush the new religious movement. Paul L. Maier and R.T. France reject this however, France writing "What Christian writer of exemplary fiction would willingly choose Herod the Idumaean, of all unlikely candidates, to represent Israel, and a group of innocent children murdered in Bethlehem to stand for Israel's punishment."

Most of this chapter's content is found in no other gospel and differs sharply from the infancy narrative in Luke 2. Conservative scholars have developed theories to explain these discrepancies which allow them to stand by the inerrancy of the Bible. Other scholars feel that this part of the Gospel of Matthew is not a literal work of history: for example, Gundry sees Matthew's gospel as a heavily embellished version of Luke's, with the humble shepherds transformed into the more exotic magi.

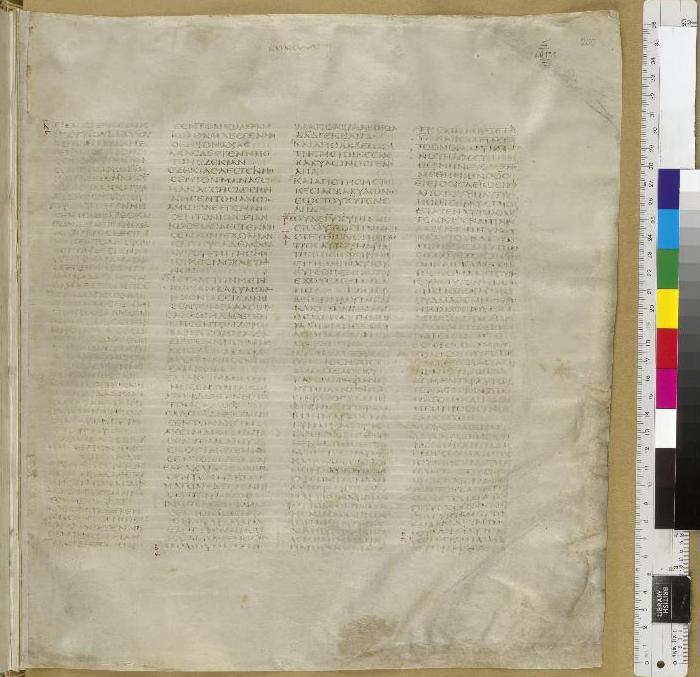
Codex Sinaiticus (AD 330–360), Matthew 1:1–2:5

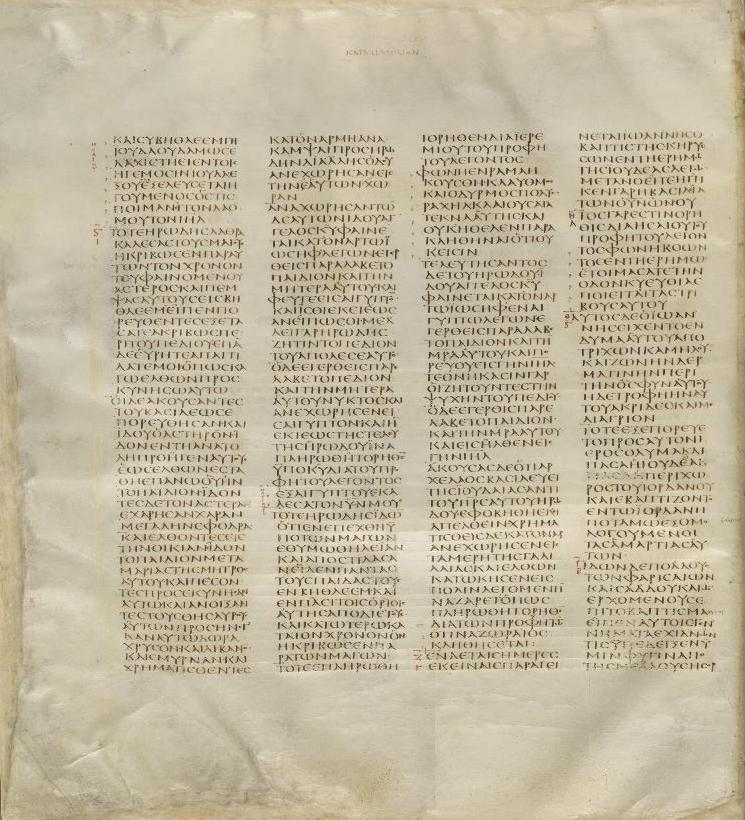
Codex Sinaiticus (AD 330–360), Matthew 2:5–3:7

== Verses ==
- Matthew 2:1
- Matthew 2:2
- Matthew 2:3
- Matthew 2:4
- Matthew 2:5
- Matthew 2:6
- Matthew 2:7
- Matthew 2:8
- Matthew 2:9
- Matthew 2:10
- Matthew 2:11
- Matthew 2:12
- Matthew 2:13
- Matthew 2:14
- Matthew 2:15
- Matthew 2:16
- Matthew 2:17
- Matthew 2:18
- Matthew 2:19
- Matthew 2:20
- Matthew 2:21
- Matthew 2:22
- Matthew 2:23

== See also ==
- Star of Bethlehem
