= Bartholomew of Brescia =

Bartholomew of Brescia (b. probably in the second half of the 12th century at Brescia; died 1258) was an Italian canonist.

== Life ==
He studied Roman and ecclesiastical law at Bologna, where he himself became a teacher. It is believed that he was murdered, when Ezzelino, the leader of the Ghibellines, captured Brescia (1258).

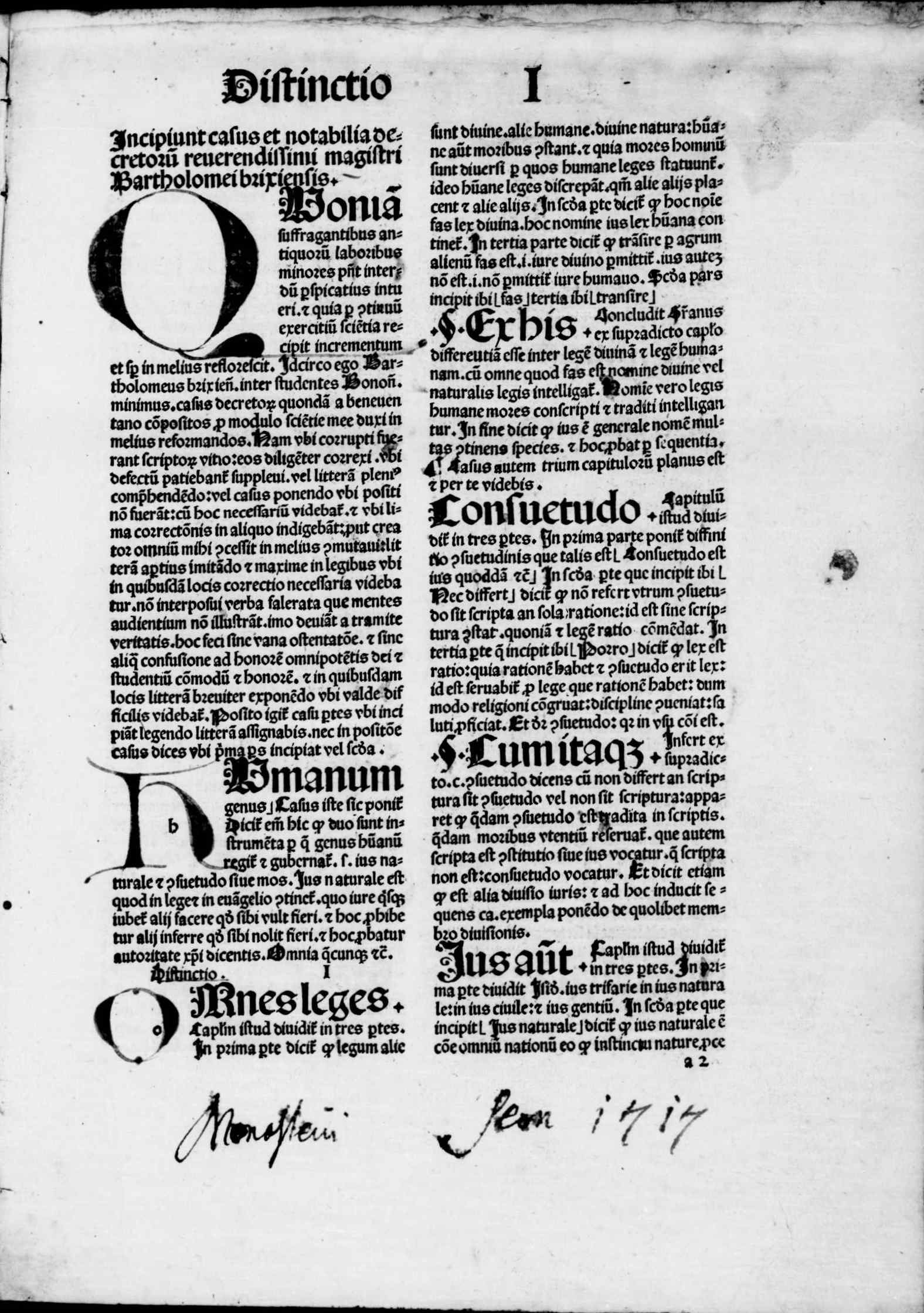
Casus decretorum, 1489

== Works ==
His literary work consisted almost entirely in the revision of the productions of other writers. His "Brocarda", or Canonical Rules (Lyons, 1519), were a working-over of those of Damasus (12th and 13th centuries); his "Casus decretorum" were a revision of the "Casus" of Benencasa (d. c. 1206); the "Historiae super libro Decretorum" reproduced the work of an unknown author. Both his "Casus" and "Historiae" derive their importance from their incorporation into the Paris edition (1505) of Gratian's Decretum.

The "Ordo Judiciarius" of Tancred (d. c. 1235) was also revised by Bartholomew.

More important than the preceding works was his "Glossa Ordinaria" to the "Decretum" of Gratian, a correction of the "Glossa", or "Apparatus", of Johannes Teutonicus Zemeke (13th century). His only certain independent work was the "Quaestiones dominicales et veneriales", lectures delivered on Sundays and Fridays.

=== Editions ===
- Casus decretorum (in Latin). Basel: Nikolaus Kesler. 1489.

== Bibliography ==
- Johann Friedrich von Schulte, Gesch. der Quellen u. Literatur des kan. Rechts (Stuttgart, 1875–80), II, 83-88
- Scherer in Kirchenlexikon (2d ed., Freiburg, 1882), I, 2055, 2056
- Hugo von Hurter, Nomenclator literarius theologiae catholicae (3rd ed., 1903)
