= Johannes Teutonicus Zemeke =

Catholic scholar

Johannes Teutonicus Zemeke (died 1245), also Joannes Simeca Teutonicus and John Zimeke, was a Decretist glossator, best known for his glosses on Gratian's Decretum in collaboration with Bartholomew of Brescia.

== Biography ==
Johannes studied the two laws at the University of Bologna (under the guidance of Azo in civil law) and spoke German, Italian, French and Latin. His works comprise the gloss on Gratian's Decretum and that on the constitutions of the Fourth Lateran Council. Successively canon, provost of the chapter of Halberstadt, provincial of the Dominicans for Hungary, then for Lombardy (while the province was leagued against Frederick II), and general of the Dominicans, he was a close friend of the emperor of Germany. He was obliged to part from him, which explains his political contradictions: no Empire outside the Church, but an imperial power coming from God.

== Works ==
- John Teutonicus, Apparatus glossarum in compilationem tertiam, Kenneth Pennington (ed.), Vatican, 1981.
