= Glossa Ordinaria =

Medieval scholarly Bible in which the text is surrounded by learned commentary

The Glossa Ordinaria, which is Latin for "Ordinary [i.e. in a standard form] Gloss", is a collection of biblical commentaries in the form of glosses. The glosses are drawn mostly from the Church Fathers, but the text was arranged by scholars during the twelfth century. The Gloss is called "ordinary" to distinguish it from other gloss commentaries. In origin, it is not a single coherent work, but a collection of independent commentaries which were revised over time. The Glossa Ordinaria was a standard reference work into the Early Modern period, although it was supplemented by the Postills attributed to Hugh of St Cher and the commentaries of Nicholas of Lyra.

== Composition ==
Before the 20th century, this Glossa Ordinaria was misattributed to Walafrid Strabo. The main impetus for the composition of the gloss came from the school of Anselm of Laon (d. 1117) and his brother Ralph. Another scholar associated with Auxerre, Gilbert the Universal (d. 1134), is sometimes credited with the Gloss on much of the Old Testament, although only the gloss on the Book of Lamentations has been firmly attributed to him. The Gloss achieved a more-or-less standard form at Paris in the second half of the twelfth century.

== Editions ==
The Patrologia Latina, volumes 113 and 114, contain a version of the glossa which, as well as being misattributed to Strabo, represents a later manuscript tradition. There is currently available a facsimile of the first printed edition of a glossa, which was published at Strasbourg in 1480/1 which can be found here. There are now modern editions of the following books: Genesis; Lamentations (prothemes and ch 1); Ecclesiastes; Song of Songs; Matthew, John, the Epistles of John; the Book of Revelation; and others.

== Other works ==
It is a parallel tradition to the Jewish Mikraot Gedolot.

Many important works would also have their own glossa ordinaria, such as that of Accursius for Justinian's Corpus or that of Johannes Teutonicus Zemeke and Bartholomew of Brescia of Gratian.
