= Pseudo-Chrysostom =

Name used for the authors of texts once wrongly attributed to John Chrysostom

Fragment of the Old Nubian In Raphaelem archangelum.

Pseudo-Chrysostom is the designation used for the anonymous authors of texts once falsely or erroneously attributed to John Chrysostom (died 407). Most such works are sermons, since more than 500 of John's actual sermons survive.

Several works written by heretics were attributed to Chrysostom, which has ensured their survival. They are an important witness to the spirituality and mindset of certain heretical movements of the 4th and 5th centuries. Three Easter sermons of Pseudo-Chrysostom are thought to be by Apollinaris of Laodicea, the 4th-century opponent of Arianism who lapsed into the heresy that bears his name, Apollinarism. Two sermons for the octave of Easter have been identified as written by an Anomoean. These works are in Greek. The Opus imperfectum in Matthaeum, a series of sermons on the Gospel of Matthew, were written in Latin by an Arian bishop in the 5th or 6th century.

The Pseudo-Chrysostom sermon on the glorious cross, In venerabilem crucem sermo, was widely copied in its original Greek and also translated into Armenian, Latin, Old Nubian, Old Russian (East Slavic) and Syriac. The Old Nubian text is the longest surviving text in that language. The Coptic Pseudo-Chrysostom sermon on the archangel Raphael, In Raphaelem archangelum, was also translated, revised and expanded in Arabic, Ge'ez (Ethiopic) and Old Nubian.

Three sermons on Job have been attributed to Chrysostom but were in fact written by Severian of Gabala. The Second Apocryphal Apocalypse of John is presented in some manuscripts as a sermon of Chrysostom.

== Sources ==
- Brock, Sebastian P. (1985). "Review of Chrysostomus Nubianus: An Old Nubian Version of Ps. Chrysostom, In venerabilem crucem sermo by Gerald M. Browne". Bulletin of the School of Oriental and African Studies, University of London. 48 (3): 613. doi:10.1017/S0041977X00039173. S2CID 176938844.
- Browne, Gerald M. (1994). "Ad Ps.-Chrysostomi In Raphaelem Archangelum sermonem II". Orientalia, Nova Series. 63 (2): 93–97.
- Cross, F. L.; Livingstone, E. A., eds. (2009) [2005]. "Chrysostom, Pseudo-". The Oxford Dictionary of the Christian Church (3rd rev. ed.). Oxford University Press. ISBN 9780192802903.
- Lehmann, Henning J. (1970). "The Attribution of Certain Pseudo-Chrysostomica to Severian of Gabala Confirmed by the Armenian Tradition". Studia Patristica. 10: 121–130.
- Plumley, J. M. (1985). "Review of Chrysostomus Nubianus: An Old Nubian Version of Ps. Chrysostom, In venerabilem crucem sermo by Gerald M. Browne". The Journal of Theological Studies. New Series. 36 (2): 493. doi:10.1093/jts/36.2.493.
- Spittler, Janet E. (2019). "2 Apocryphal Apocalypse of John". e-Clavis: Christian Apocrypha. North American Society for the Study of Christian Apocryphal Literature (NASSCAL).
- Tóth, Péter (2017). "New Wine in Old Wineskin: Byzantine Reuses of the Apocryphal Revelation Dialogue". In Averil Cameron; Niels Gaul (eds.). Dialogues and Debates from Late Antiquity to Late Byzantium. pp. 77–93.
