= Massacre of the Innocents =

Narrative from Christian Bible

Saints Holy Innocents
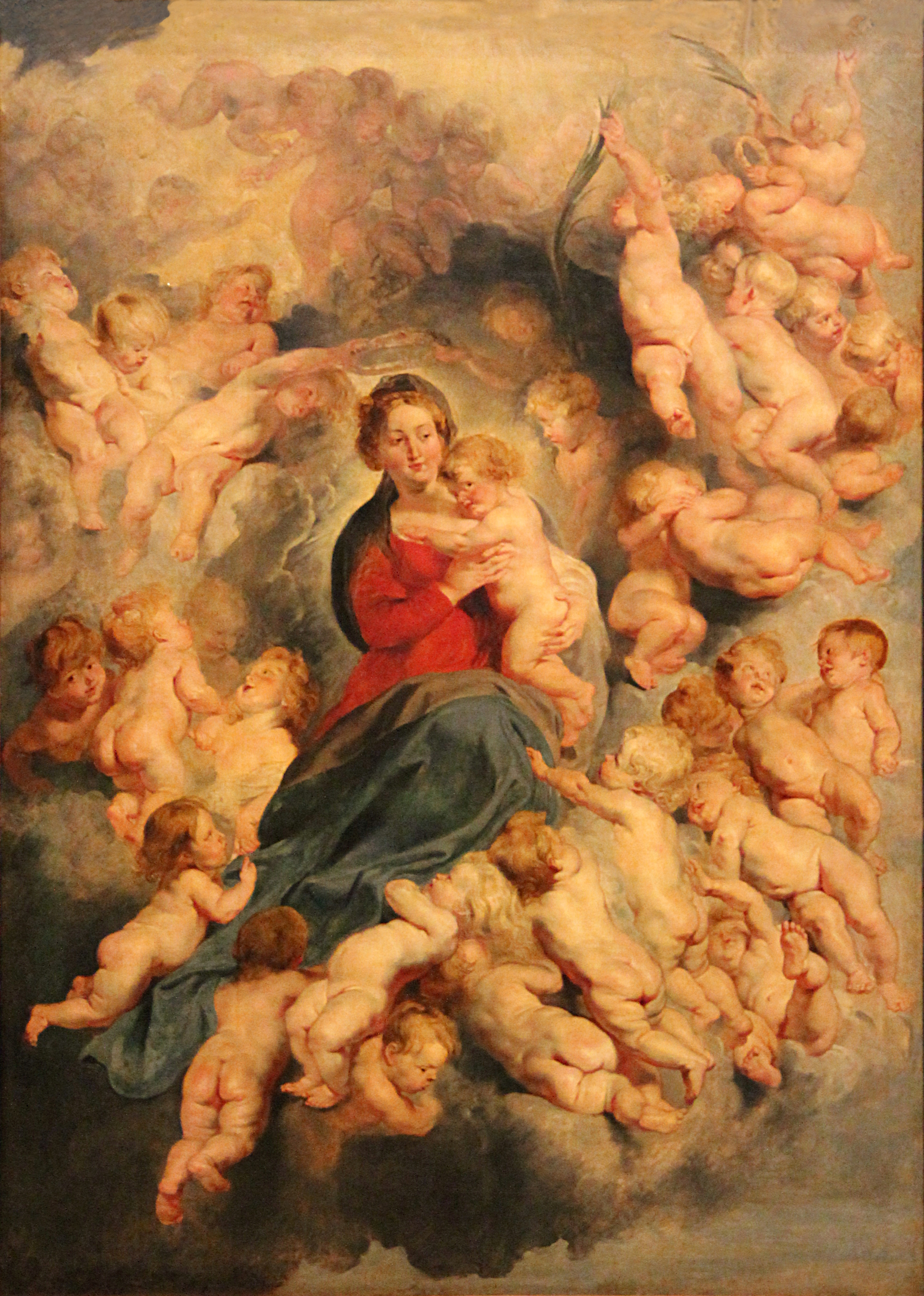
- The Virgin and Child Surrounded by the Holy Innocents by Peter Paul Rubens

First Martyrs
- Born: Various, presumably close to the birth of Jesus; Bethlehem, Herodian Kingdom of Judea, Roman Empire
- Died: c. 7–2 BC; Bethlehem, Herodian Kingdom of Judea, Roman Empire (martyred by King Herod the Great)
- Cause of death: Infanticide
- Venerated in: Catholic Church; Eastern Orthodoxy; Oriental Orthodoxy; Lutheranism; Anglicanism
- Canonized: Pre-Congregation
- Feast: 27 December (West Syriac); 28 December (Catholic Church, Lutheran Church, Anglican Communion); 29 December (Eastern Orthodoxy); 10 January (East Syriac)
- Attributes: Martyr's palm; Crown of martyrdom
- Patronage: Foundlings; Babies; Children's choirs

The Massacre (or Slaughter) of the Innocents is a story recounted in the Nativity narrative of the Gospel of Matthew (2:16–18) in which Herod the Great, king of Judea, orders the execution of all male children who are two years old and under in the vicinity of Bethlehem. It is modeled by the story of Pharaoh's attempt to kill the Israelite children in the Book of Exodus, as told in an expanded version that was current in the 1st century. Most scholars find no support for the historicity of Matthew's account of the Massacre of the Innocents.

The Feast of the Holy Innocents, also known as Childermas, is celebrated in the Western Christian Churches on 28 December, the fourth day of Christmastide. In Eastern Christianity, the feast is celebrated on various dates, depending on the denomination.

== Biblical narrative ==
The Gospel of Matthew tells how the Magi visit Jerusalem to seek guidance as to where the king of the Jews has been born; King Herod directs them to Bethlehem and asks them to return to him and report, but they are warned in a dream that Herod wishes to find the child and kill him, and do not do so. Matthew continues:

When Herod realized that he had been outwitted by the Magi, he was furious, and he gave orders to kill all the boys in Bethlehem and its vicinity who were two years old and under, in accordance with the time he had learned from the Magi.

— Matthew 2:16

This is followed by a reference to and quotation from the Book of Jeremiah (Jeremiah 31:15; Jeremiah 31:14 in the Hebrew Bible): "Then what was said through the prophet Jeremiah was fulfilled: A voice is heard in Ramah, weeping and great mourning, Rachel weeping for her children and refusing to be comforted, because they are no more." (Matthew 2:17–18). The relevance of this to the massacre is not immediately apparent, as Jeremiah's next verses go on to speak of hope and restoration.

== Historicity and theology ==
The historicity of the Matthew account is not accepted by most modern scholars. The story of the massacre is found in no gospel other than Matthew, nor is it mentioned in the surviving works of Nicolaus of Damascus (who was a personal friend of Herod the Great), nor in Josephus's Antiquities of the Jews, despite his recording many of Herod's misdeeds, including the murder of three of his own sons.

The early 5th-century account of Macrobius—that "on hearing that the son of Herod, king of the Jews, had been slain when Herod ordered that all boys in Syria under the age of two be killed, [Augustus] said, 'It's better to be Herod's pig than his son'"—has been discounted as extra-biblical evidence for the event due to its later authorship, possible influence of the gospel narrative, and the confused nature of the account.

In view of the lack of independent confirmation that the event occurred, the story serves as a kind of folklore inspired by Herod's reputation. Many view the discussion of historicity as secondary, given that gospels were primarily written as theological documents rather than chronological timelines.

The author appears to have modeled the episode on the biblical story of Pharaoh's attempt to kill the Israelite children in the Book of Exodus, as told in an expanded version that was current in the 1st century. In that expanded story, Pharaoh kills the Hebrew children after his scribes warn him of the impending birth of the threat to his crown (i.e., Moses), but Moses' father and mother are warned in a dream that the child's life is in danger and act to save him. Later in life, after Moses has to flee, like Jesus, he returns when those who sought his death are themselves dead.

Some conservative scholars such as apologist Paul L. Maier, and the Anglican scholar Richard T. France have offered arguments in favour of the historicity of the account, though these arguments are not accepted by most scholars. James Dunn views the massacre story as being an action in line with Herod's known character. Joan E. Taylor and Anthony Le Donne observe that Herod was a vindictive and harsh ruler, and it was common for Jews at the time to face becoming refugees, frequently in Egypt. Taylor argues that the Historical Jesus could indeed have been a refugee whose background shaped his teachings.

== Numbers ==
The Byzantine Rite liturgy asserts 14,000 Holy Innocents, while an early Syrian list of saints asserts 64,000. Coptic sources assert 144,000 and that it took place on 29 December. Frederick George Holweck's 1910 entry on the subject in the Catholic Encyclopedia referenced estimates that both assumed the event actually occurred and recognized that Bethlehem was too small a town to provide such numbers, reducing the victims to between 6 and 20 children in the town. (Note: Holweck 1910 states "The Greek Liturgy asserts that Herod killed 14,000 boys (ton hagion id chiliadon Nepion), the Syrians speak of 64,000, many medieval authors of 144,000, according to Apocalypse 14:3. Writers who accept the historicity of the episode reduce the number considerably, since Bethlehem was a rather small town. Joseph Knabenbauer brings it down to fifteen or twenty (Evang. S. Matt., I, 104), August Bisping to ten or twelve (Evang. S. Matt.), Lorenz Kellner to about six (Christus und seine Apostel, Freiburg, 1908)".) France, citing estimates that Bethlehem's population would have been around 1,000 people at the time the event was supposed to occur, concurred with an upper limit of around 20 children killed if it was indeed a historical event.

== In Christian art ==
Medieval liturgical drama recounted Biblical events, including Herod's slaughter of the innocents. The Pageant of the Shearmen and Tailors, performed in Coventry, England, included a haunting song about the episode now known as the Coventry Carol. The Ordo Rachelis tradition of four plays includes the Flight into Egypt, Herod's succession by Archelaus, the return from Egypt, as well as the Massacre, all centered on Rachel weeping in fulfillment of Jeremiah's prophecy. These events were likewise in one of the medieval N-Town Plays.

The "Coventry Carol" is a Christmas carol dating from the 16th century. The carol was performed in Coventry in England as part of a mystery play called The Pageant of the Shearmen and Tailors. The play depicts the Christmas story from chapter two in the Gospel of Matthew. The carol refers to the Massacre of the Innocents, in which Herod ordered all male infants two years old and under in Bethlehem to be killed. The lyrics of this haunting carol represent a mother's lament for her doomed child. The author is unknown. The oldest known text was written down by Robert Croo in 1534, and the melody dates from 1591. The carol is traditionally sung a cappella.

The 17th century Dutch Christmas song O Kerstnacht, schoner dan de dagen, while beginning with a reference to Christmas Night, is about the Massacre of the Innocents. In 1974, the Dutch progressive rock band Focus recorded the first two verses of the song for their album Hamburger Concerto.

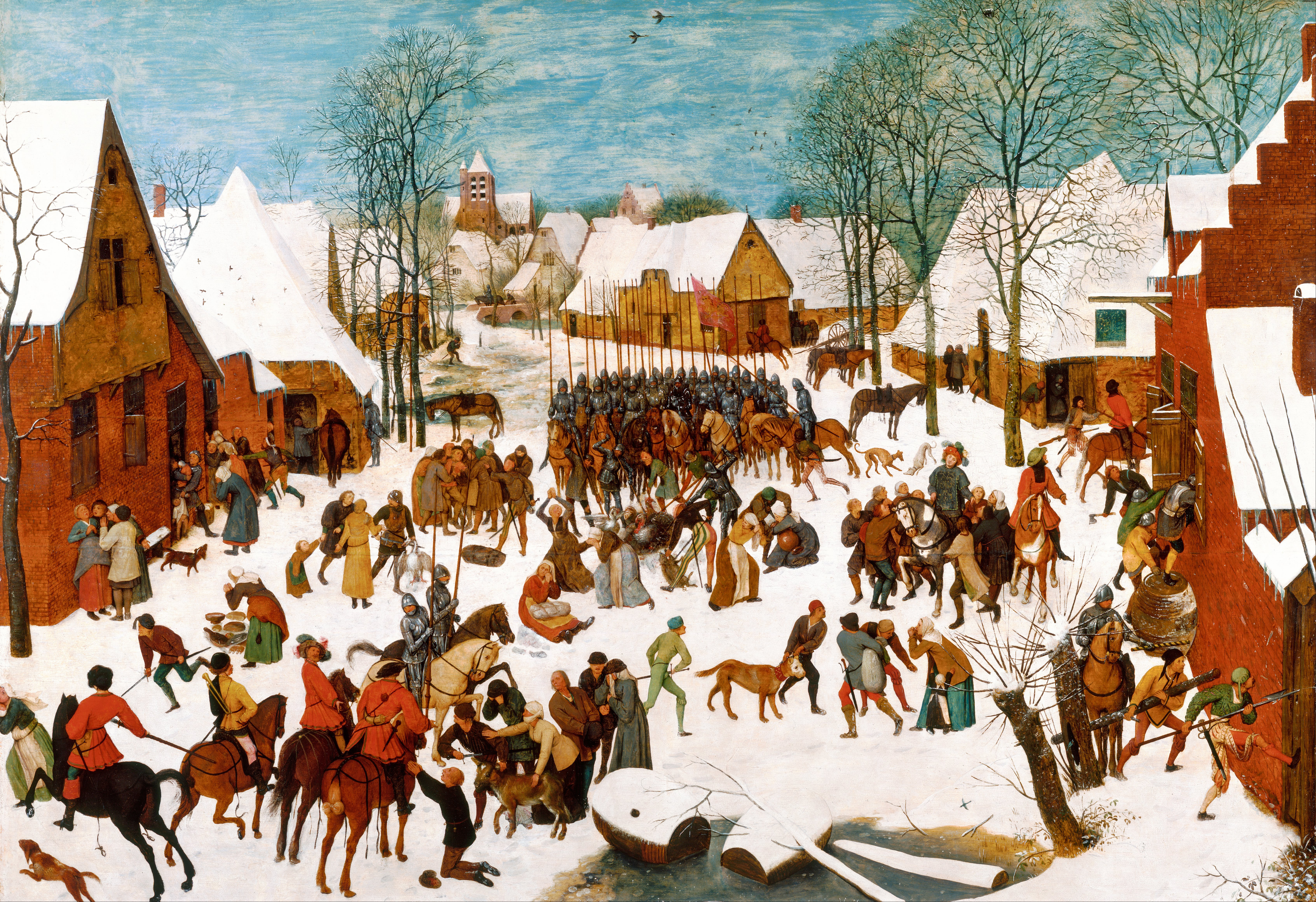
Pieter Brueghel the Elder, Massacre of the Innocents

The subject of the "Massacre of the Innocents" has provided artists of many nationalities with opportunities to compose complicated depictions of massed bodies in violent action. It was an alternative to the Flight into Egypt in cycles of the Life of the Virgin. It decreased in popularity in Gothic art, but revived in the larger works of the Renaissance, when artists took inspiration for their "Massacres" from Roman reliefs of the battle of the Lapiths and Centaurs to the extent that they showed the figures heroically nude. The horrific subject matter of the Massacre of the Innocents also provided a comparison of ancient brutalities with the brutalities of the early modern period, during the period of religious wars that followed the Reformation—Bruegel's versions show the soldiers carrying banners with the Habsburg double-headed eagle.

The 1590 version by Cornelis van Haarlem also seems to reflect the violence of the Dutch Revolt and does not depict the mothers merely as passive victims but also as enacting revenge on one of the murderers. Guido Reni's early (1611) Massacre of the Innocents, in an unusual vertical format, is at Bologna. The Flemish painter Peter Paul Rubens painted the theme more than once. One version, now in Munich, was engraved and reproduced as a painting as far away as colonial Peru.

=== Paintings ===
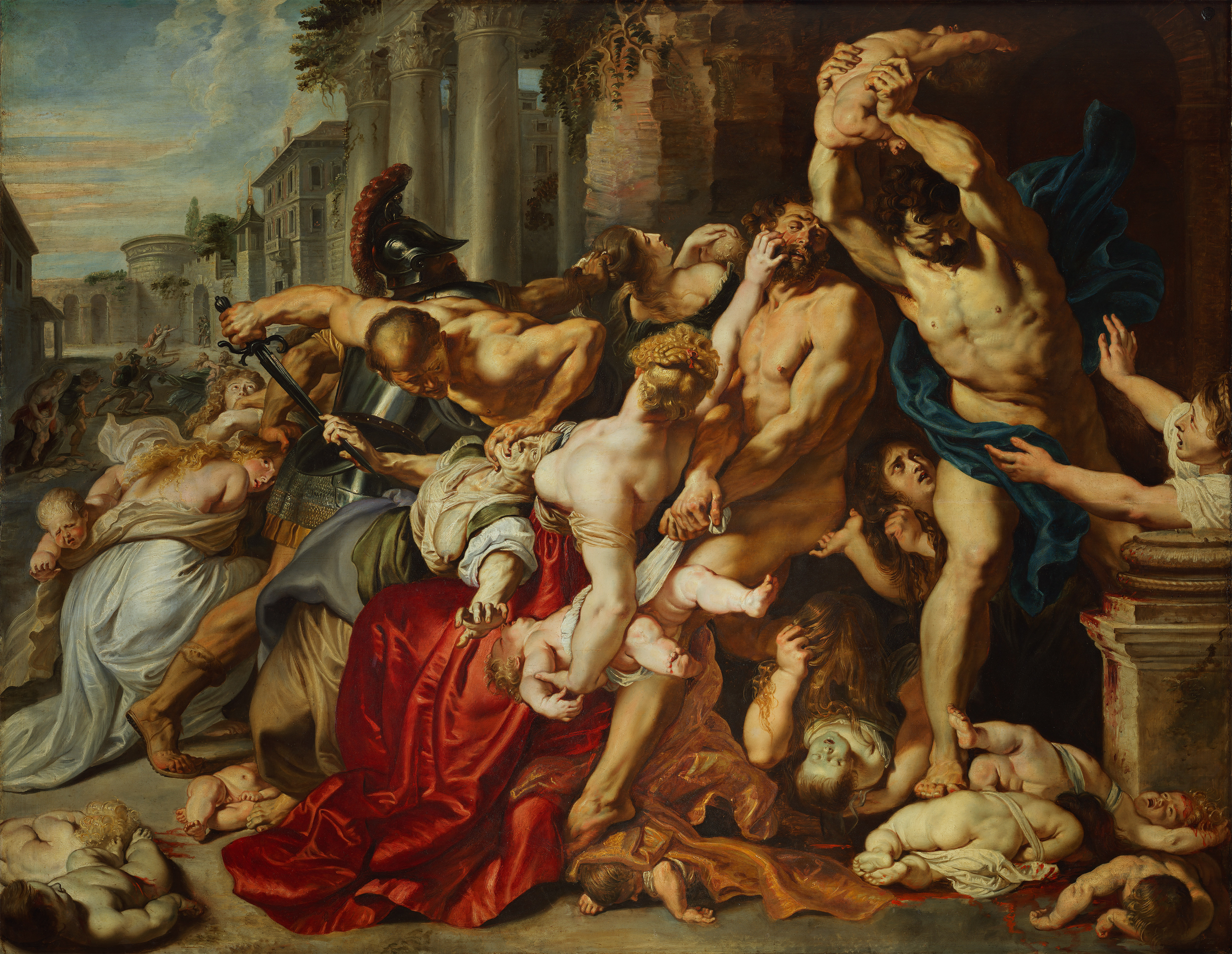
Rubens, Massacre of the Innocents, 1610–11, Toronto

- Massacre of the Innocents by the Bruegels. Several versions of The Massacre of the Innocents were painted by Pieter Bruegel the Elder (c. 1565–67) and his son Pieter Brueghel the Younger (into the 17th century).
- Massacre of the Innocents by Guido Reni, created in 1611 for the Basilica of San Domenico in Bologna, but now in the Pinacoteca Nazionale in that city
- Two versions by Peter Paul Rubens, painted in 1611–1612 and 1636–1638
- The Massacre of the Innocents by Nicolas Poussin, painted between 1625 and 1632
- Massacre of the Innocents by Matteo di Giovanni

=== Music ===
The communion motet for the Feast of the Holy Innocents is the text from Matthew 2:18 (citing Jeremiah 31:15) Vox in Rama. This was set polyphonically by a number of composers of the renaissance and baroque, including Jacob Clemens non Papa, Giaches de Wert, and Heinrich Schütz (in German).

Marc-Antoine Charpentier composed an oratorio, Caedes sanctorum innocentium, H.411, for soloists, chorus, two violins, and continuo (1683–1685).

== Feast day ==
=== Dates by denomination ===
Today, the date of Holy Innocents' Day, also called the Feast of the Holy Innocents, or Childermas or Children's Mass, varies.

- 27 December for West Syrians (Syriac Orthodox Church, Syro-Malankara Catholic Church, and Maronite Church)
- 28 December in the Church of England (Festival), the Lutheran Church, and the Roman Rite of the Catholic Church, with these Western Christian denominations celebrating Childermas as the fourth day of Christmastide
- 29 December for the Eastern Orthodox Church

=== Beginnings ===
The commemoration of the massacre of the Holy Innocents, traditionally regarded as the first Christian martyrs, if unknowingly so, (Note: Irenaeus (Adv. Haer. iii.16.4) and Cyprian (Epistle 56)) first appears as a feast of the Western church in the Leonine Sacramentary, dating from about 485. The earliest commemorations were connected with the Feast of the Epiphany, 6 January: Prudentius mentions the Innocents in his hymn on the Epiphany. Leo in his homilies on the Epiphany speaks of the Innocents. Fulgentius of Ruspe (6th century) gives a homily De Epiphania, deque Innocentum nece et muneribus magorum ("On Epiphany, and on the murder of the Innocents and the gifts of the Magi"). (Note: Prudentius, Leo, and Fulgentius are noted in Smith & Cheetham 1875, pp. 839ff.)

=== Catholic medieval traditions ===
From the time of Charlemagne, Sicarius of Bethlehem was venerated at Brantôme, Dordogne, as one of the purported victims of the Massacre.

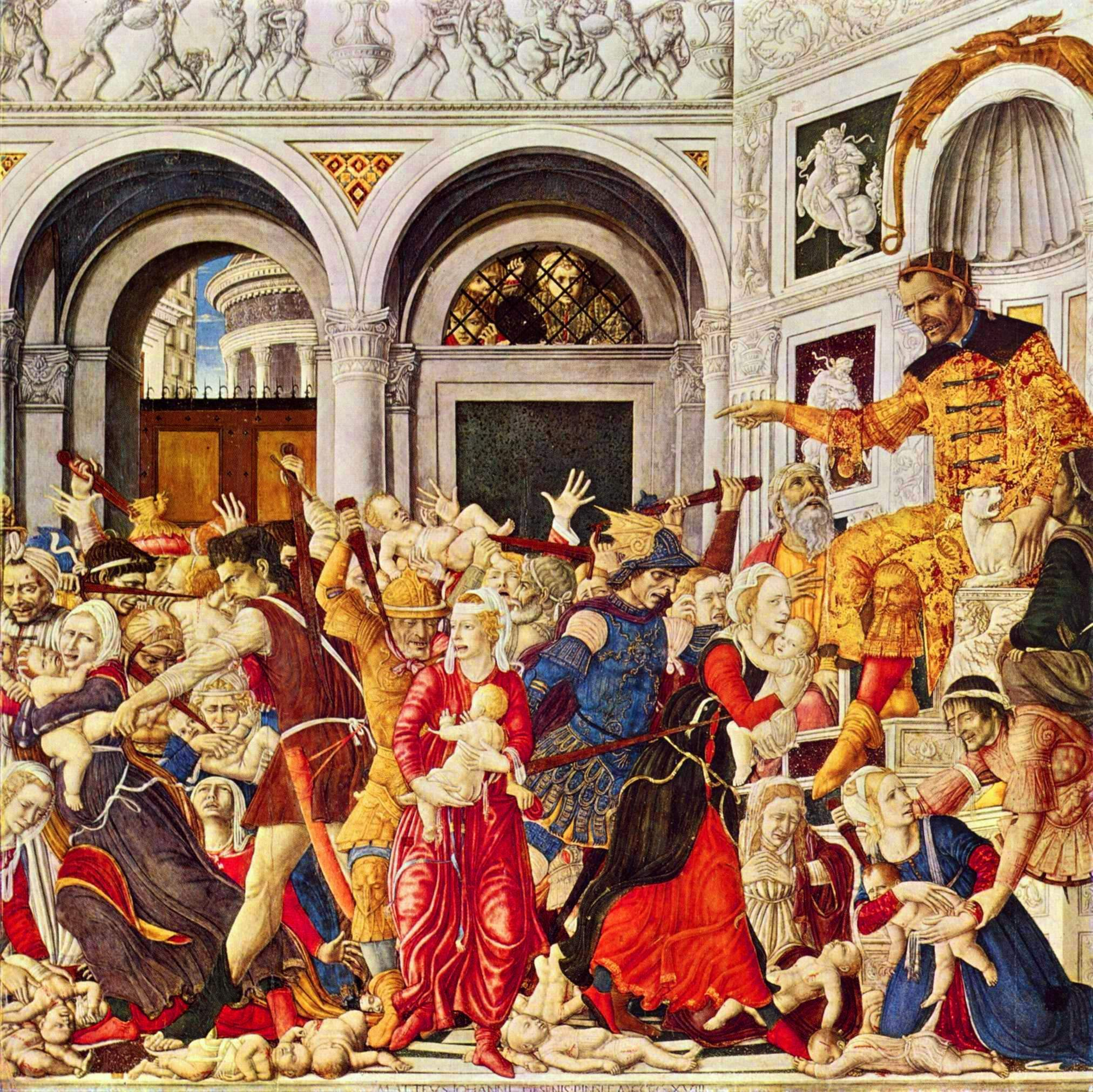
Massacre of the Innocents, Matteo di Giovanni, c. 1500

In the Middle Ages, especially north of the Alps, the day was a festival of inversion involving role reversal between children and adults such as teachers and priests, with boy bishops presiding over some church services. Bonnie Blackburn and Leofranc Holford-Strevens suggest that this was a Christianized version of the Roman annual feast of the Saturnalia (when even slaves played "masters" for a day). In some regions, such as medieval England and France, it was said to be an unlucky day when no new project should be started.

There was a medieval custom of refraining where possible from work on the day of the week on which the feast of "Innocents Day" had fallen for the whole of the following year until the next Innocents Day. Philippe de Commynes, the minister of King Louis XI of France, tells in his memoirs how the king observed this custom, and describes the trepidation he felt when he had to inform the king of an emergency on the day.

=== Contemporary traditions in Western Christianity ===
In denominations of Western Christianity, such as Catholicism and Lutheranism, some Christians attend Mass on Childermas to remember the martyrdom of the Holy Innocents.

In England, the memorial is referred to as Childermas or Children's Mass in which "Children are given a blessing; they sing in the choir and take on other special roles in the church service."

In Spain, Hispanic America, and the Philippines, 28 December is called Day of the Holy Innocents and is a day for pranks, equivalent to April Fool's Day in many countries. Pranks (bromas) are also known as inocentadas and their victims are called inocentes; alternatively, the pranksters are the inocentes and the victims should not be angry at them, since they could not have committed any sin. One of the more famous of these traditions is the annual "Els Enfarinats" festival of Ibi in Alacant, where the inocentes dress up in full military dress and incite a flour fight.

In Trinidad and Tobago, Catholic children have their toys blessed at a Mass.

=== Roman Rite before and after 1955 ===
In the Roman Rite prior to 1955, a unique feature of this feast was the use of liturgical elements ordinarily ascribed to penitential days—including violet vestments, the omission of the Gloria, and the substitution of a Tract in place of the Alleluia—unless the feast fell on Sunday, in which case the rubrics required the feast to be celebrated as on its octave day, with red vestments, Gloria, and Alleluia. The octave of this feast was suppressed by Pope Pius XII in 1955, with the feast now celebrated using the features formerly ascribed to its octave day, a practice reinforced by the 1960 Code of Rubrics.

== Gallery ==
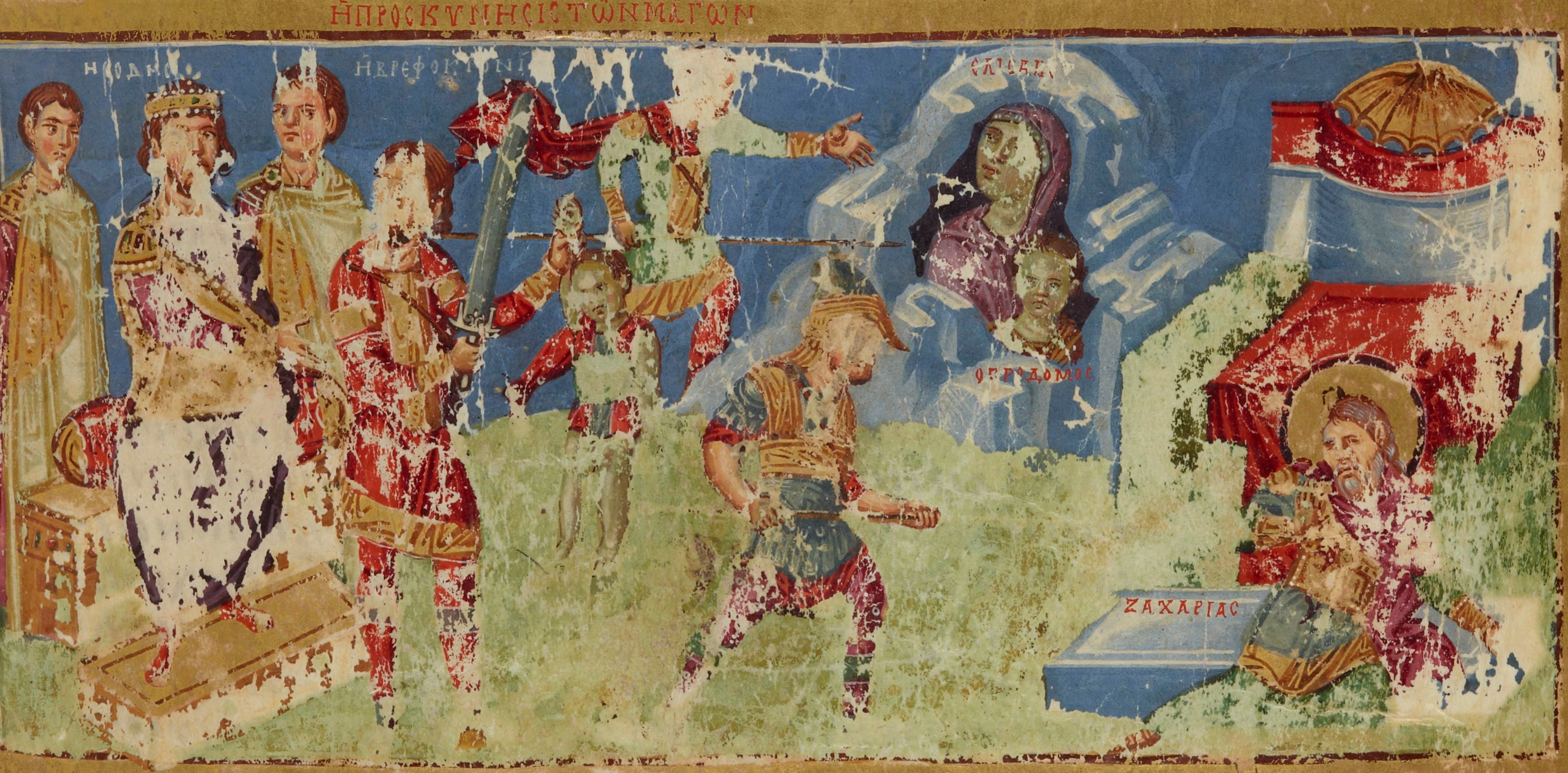
Herod orders the Massacre of the Innocents; the Flight of Elizabeth; the martyrdom of Zachariah (illumination from a 9th-century manuscript)

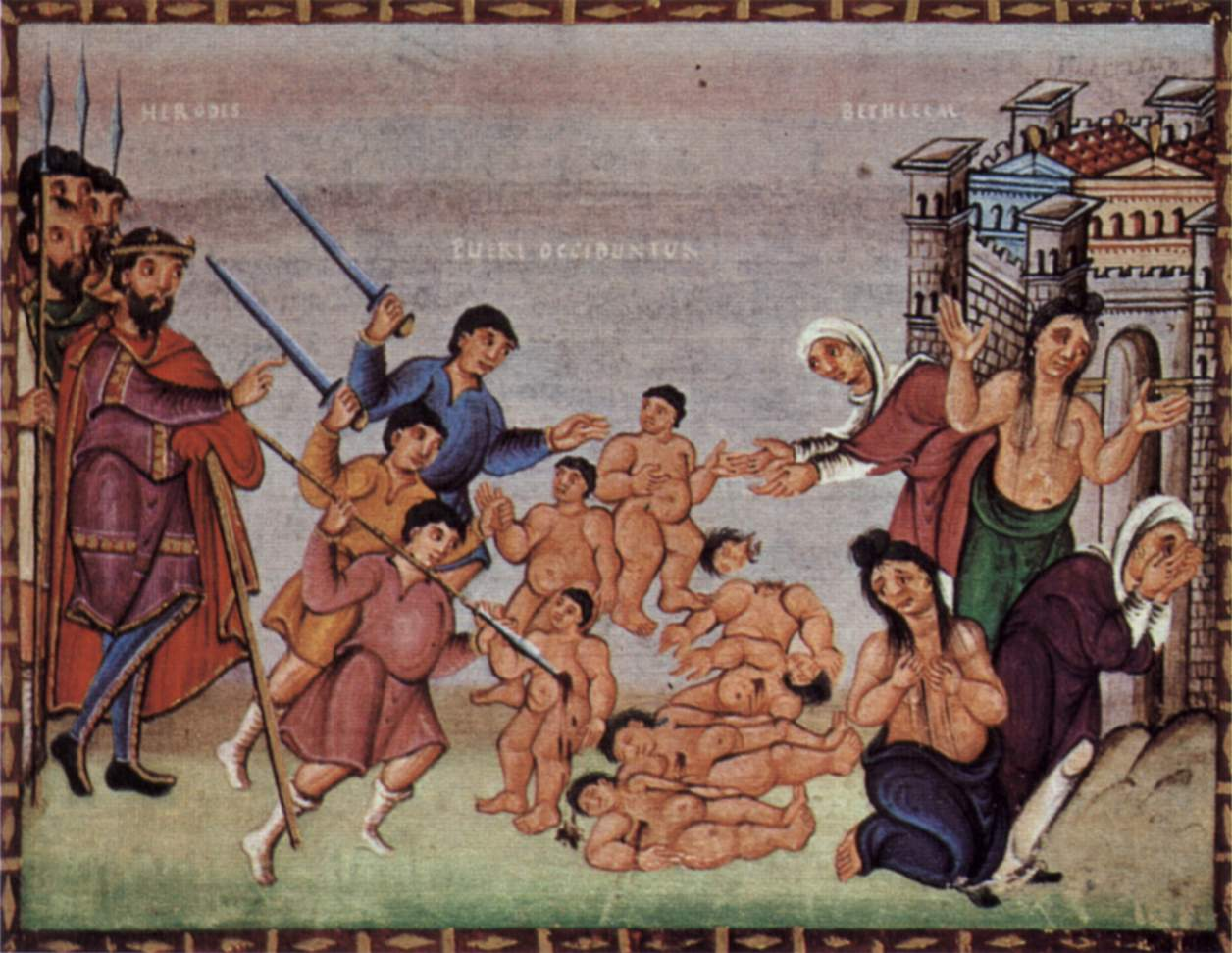
10th-century German illumination from the Codex Egberti, a devotional book of the Reichenau school

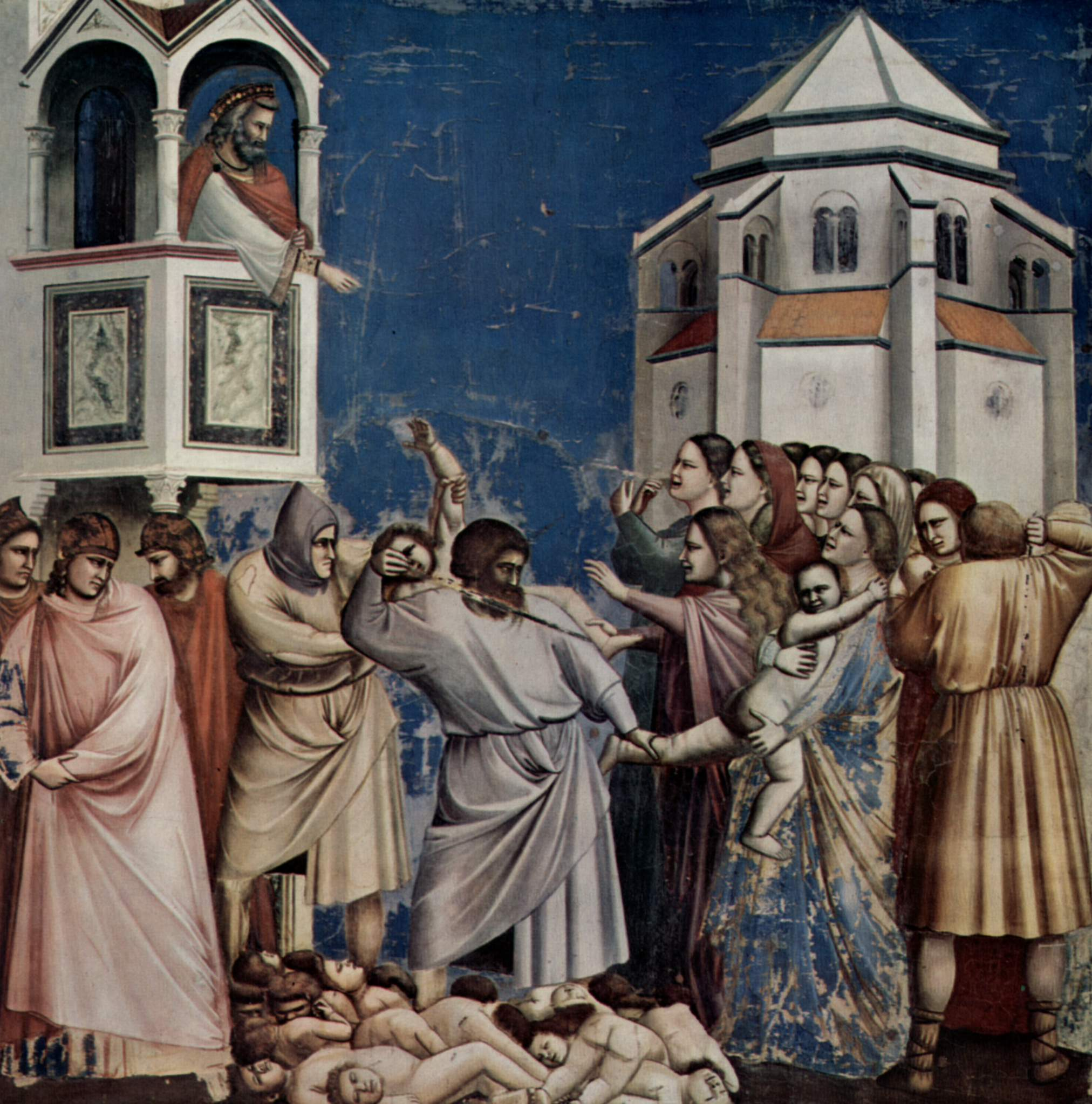
Giotto, Massacre of the Innocents

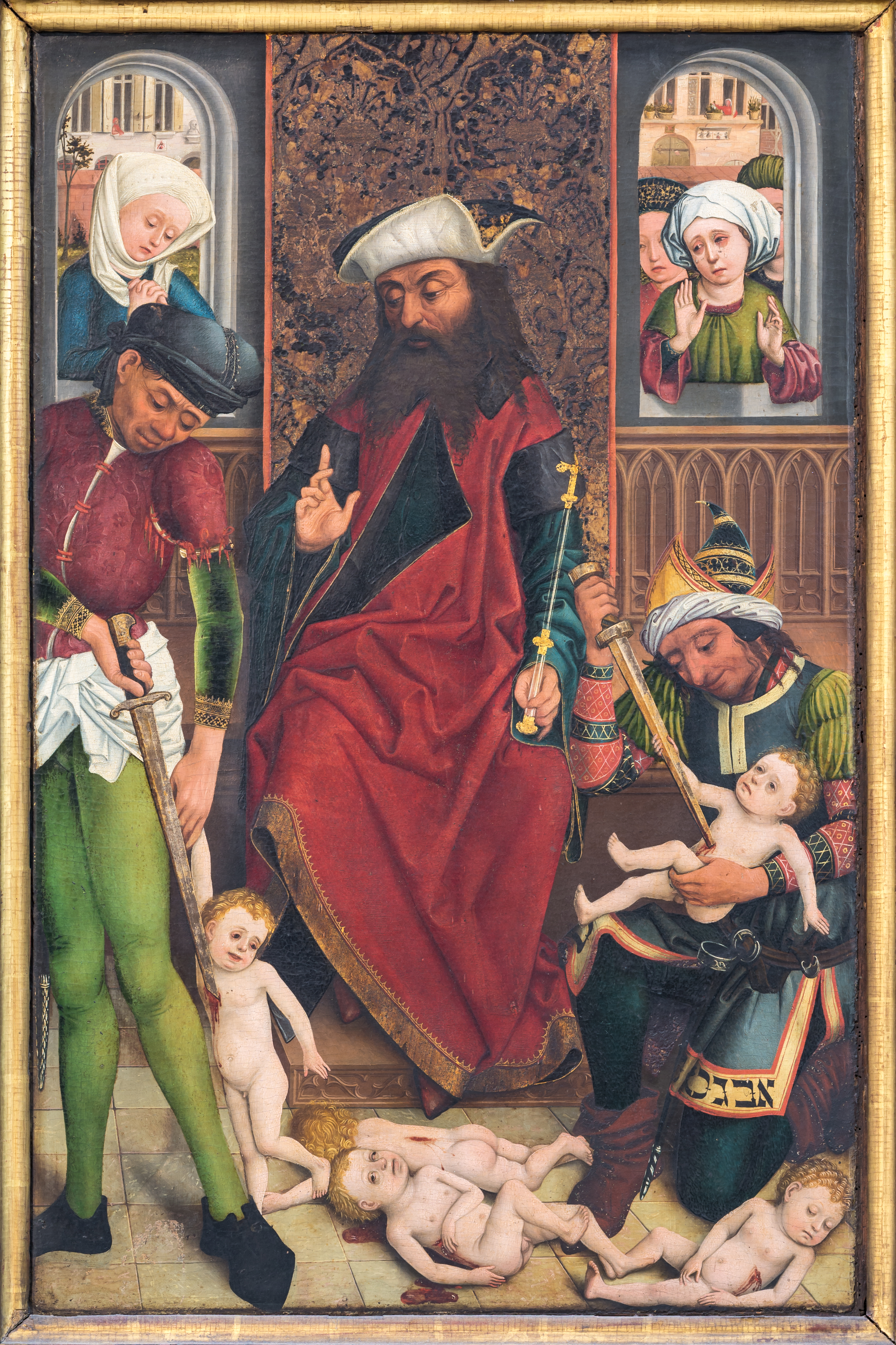
Panel from Dreikönigsaltar by Hans Pleydenwurff 1460–1465

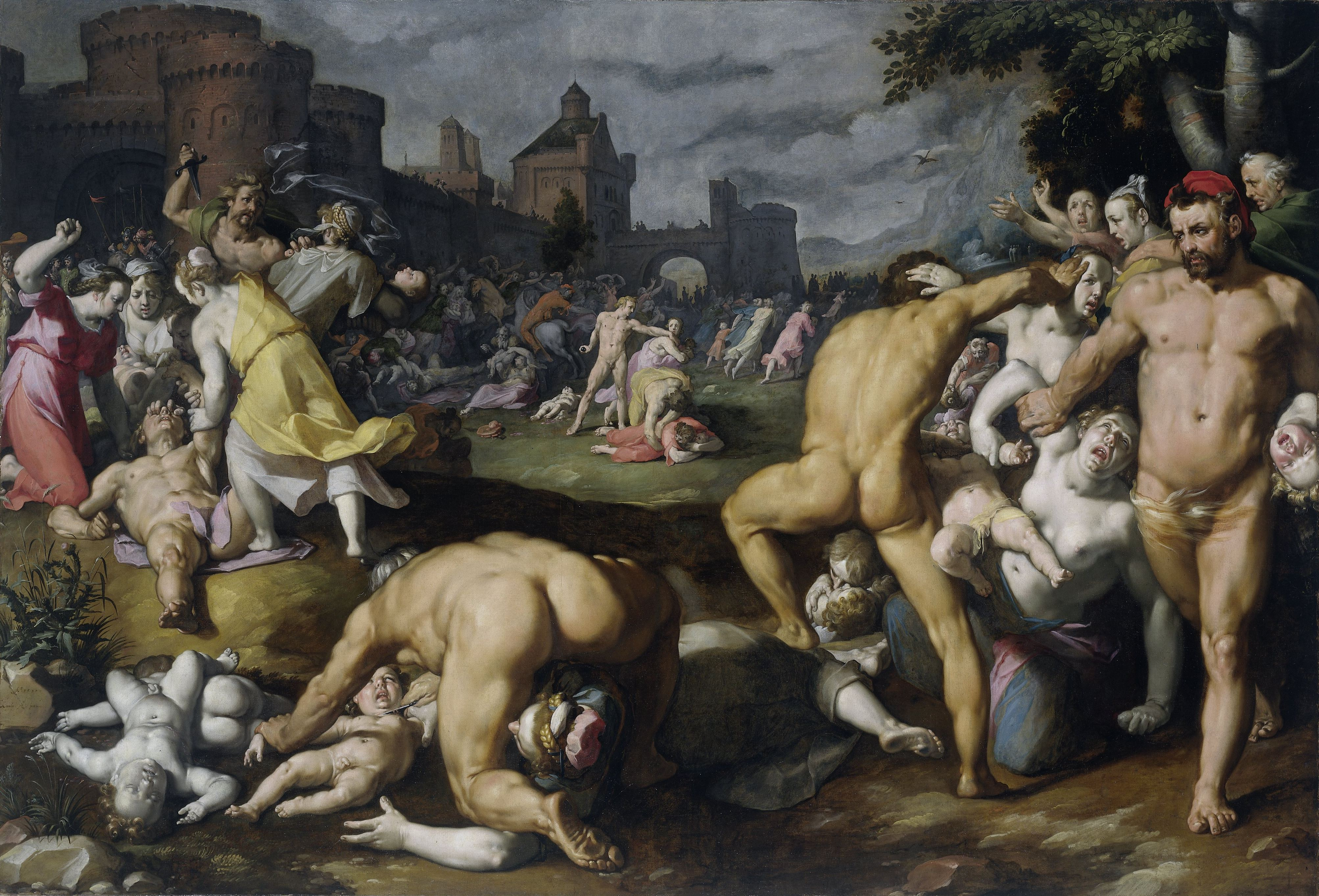
Cornelis van Haarlem, Massacre of the Innocents, 1590, Rijksmuseum

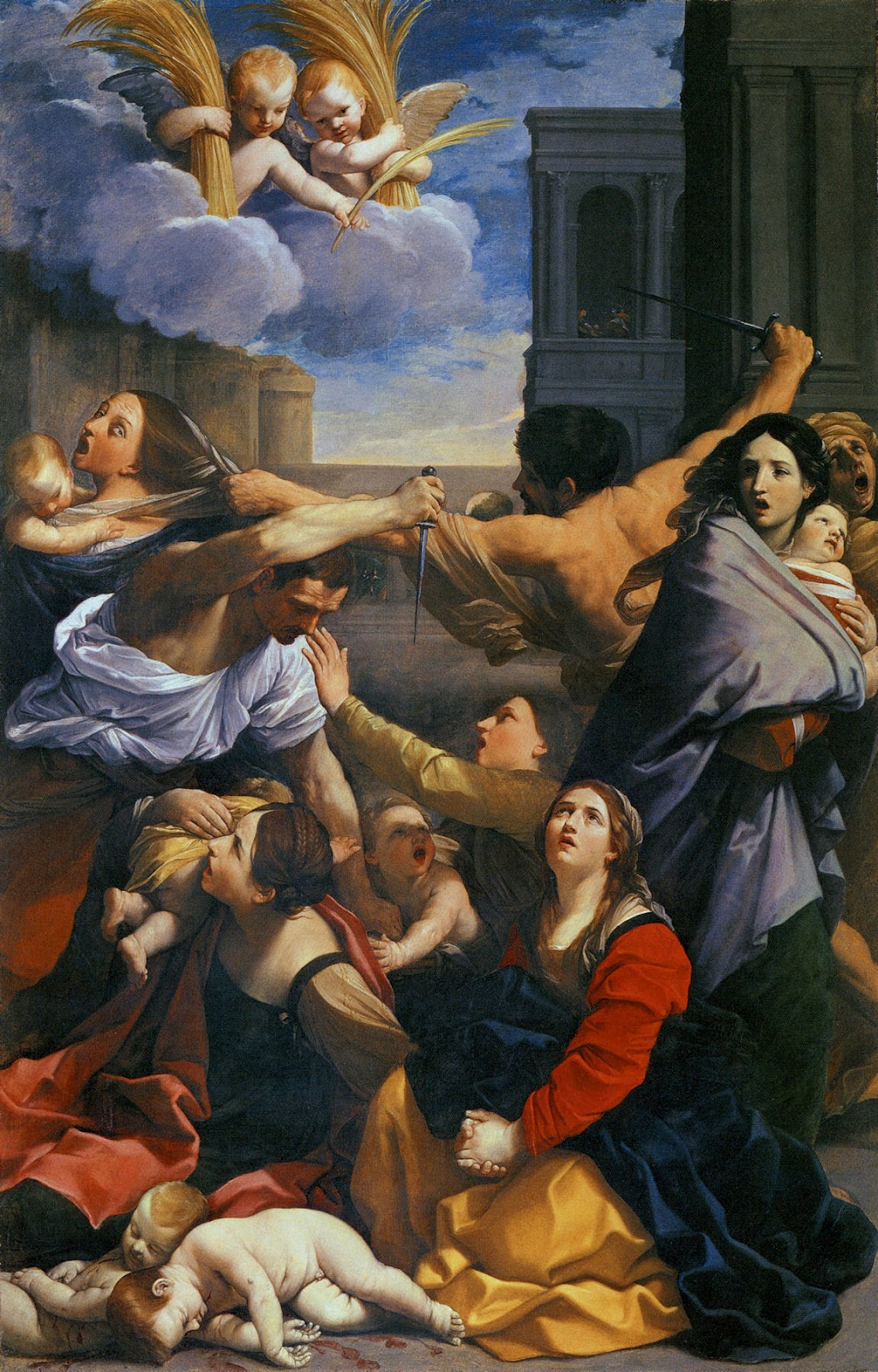
Guido Reni, Massacre of the Innocents

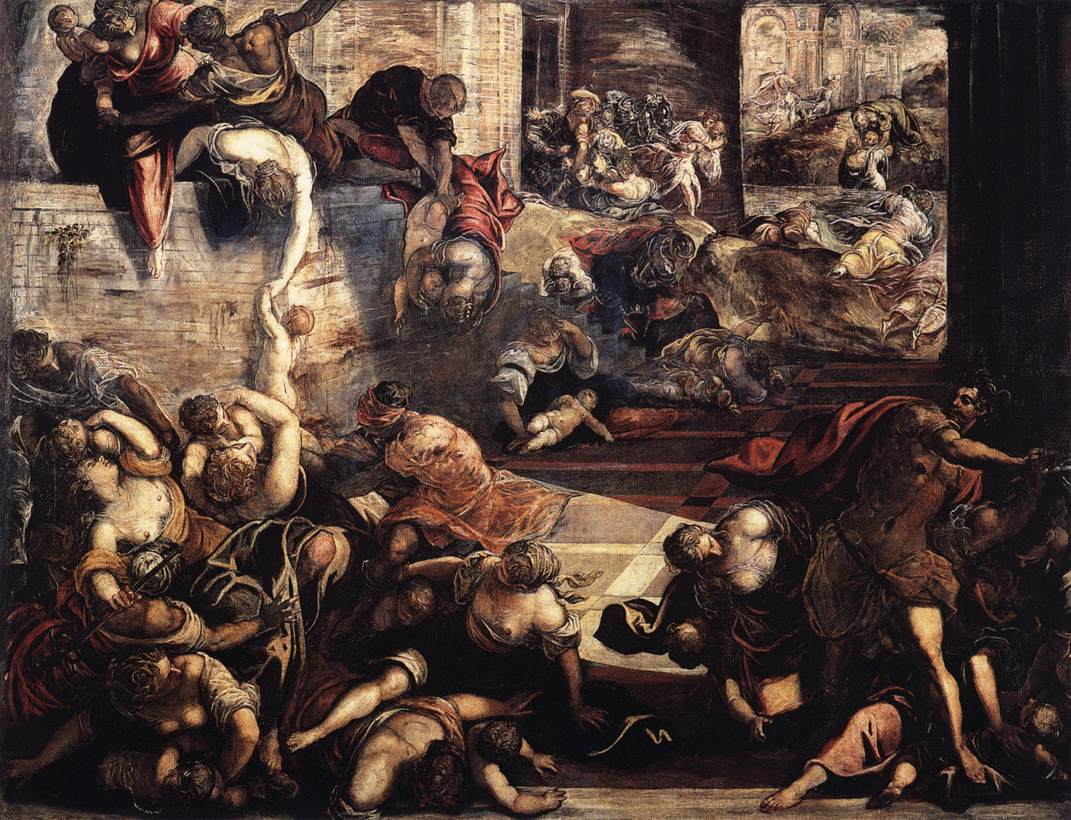
Jacopo Tintoretto, Massacre of the Innocents

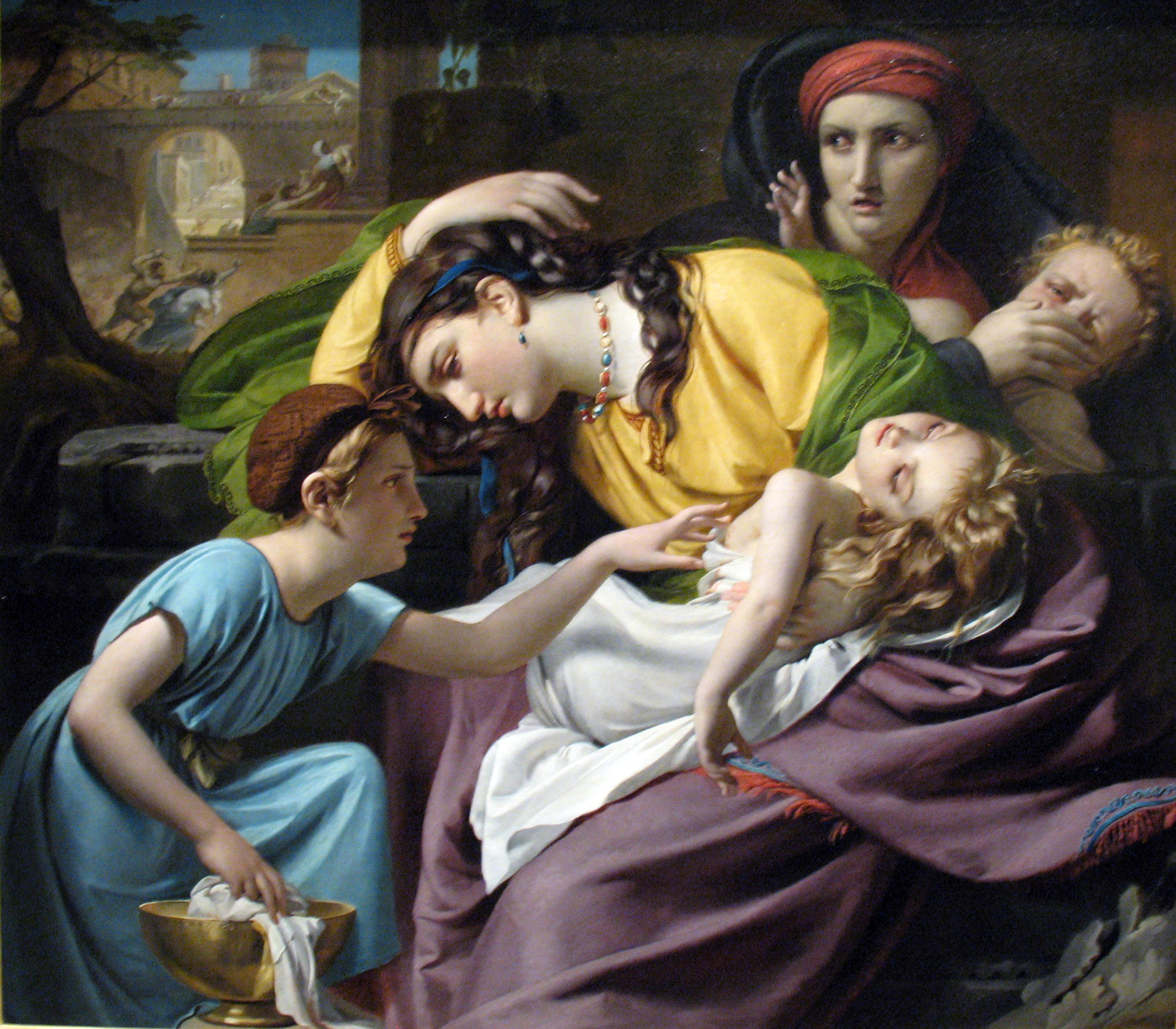
François-Joseph Navez, The massacre of the innocents, 1824

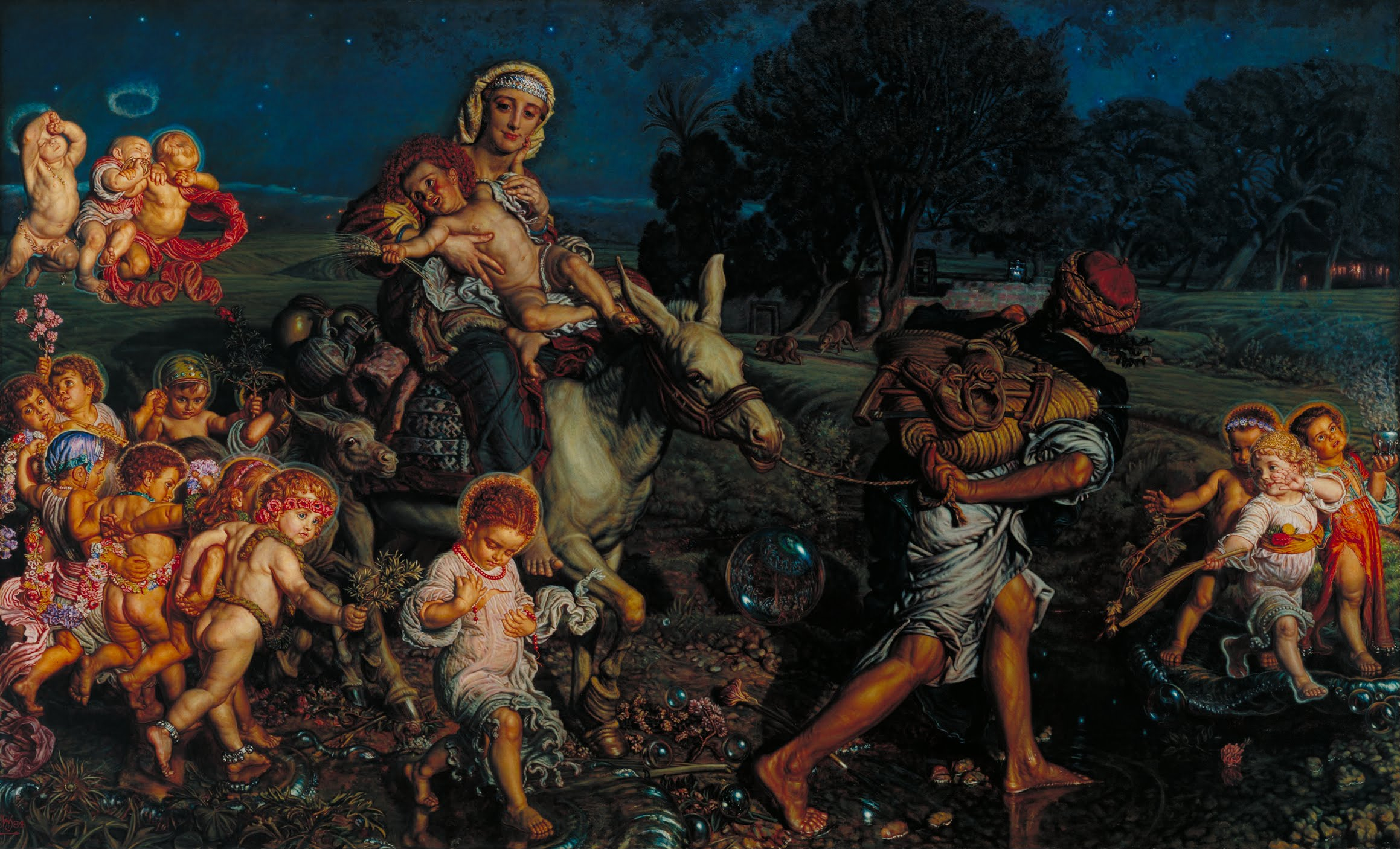
Triumph of the Innocents by William Holman Hunt

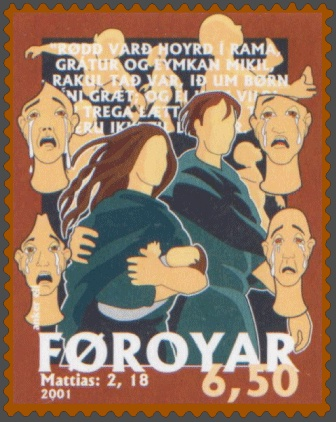
The scream from Ramah, 2001 stamp of the Faroe Islands

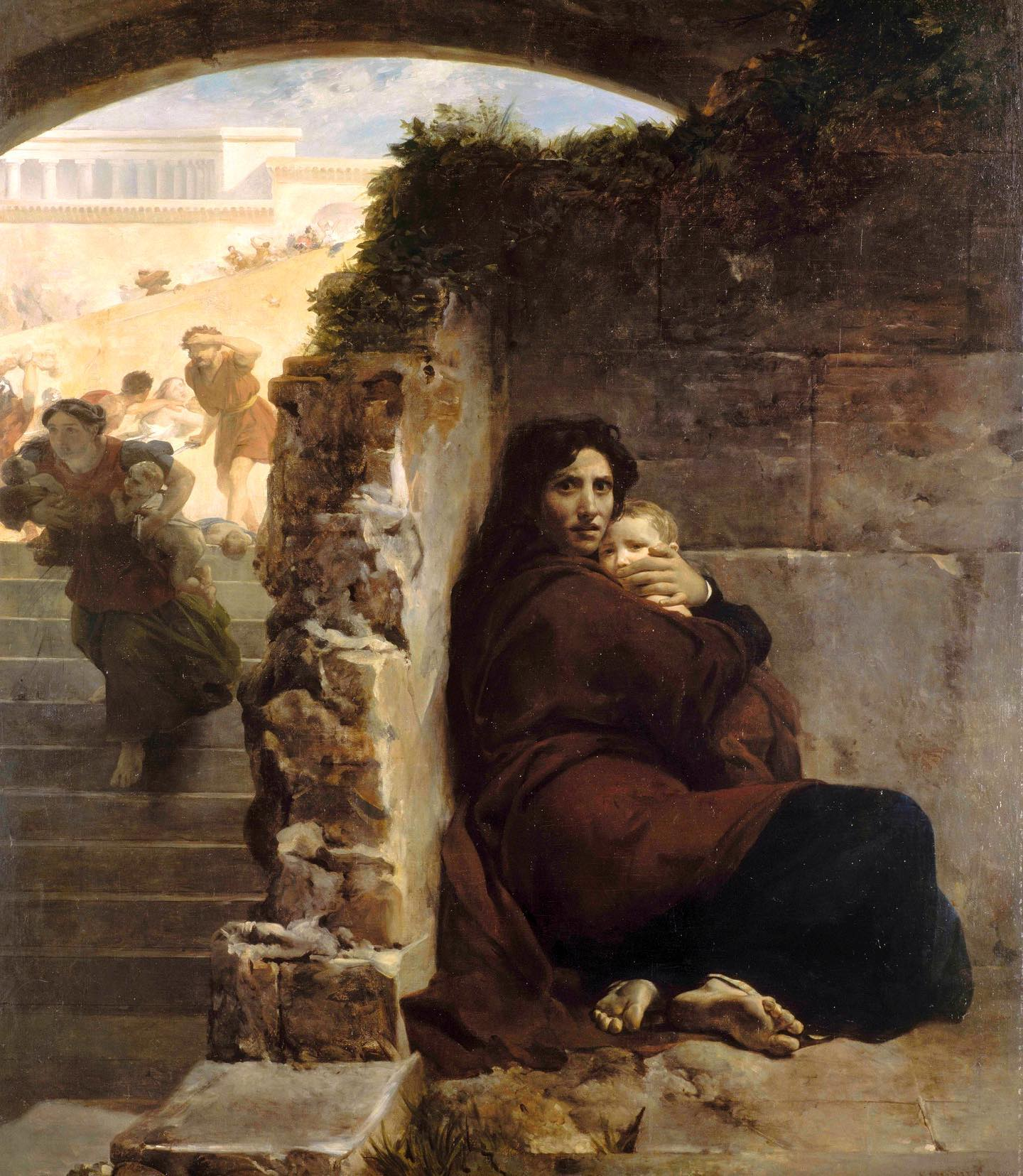
Léon Cogniet, Massacre of the Innocents, 1824

== See also ==
- Chapel of the Milk Grotto
- Church of the Nativity § Tombs
- Coventry Carol
- Flight into Egypt
- Jesus and Messianic prophecy § Jeremiah 31:15
- Star of Bethlehem

== Notes ==
Massacre of the Innocents Life of Jesus
Preceded by Flight into Egypt	New Testament; Events	Succeeded by Death of Herod, Return of young Jesus to Nazareth
