= Matthew 2:19 =

- ← 2:18 2:20 →
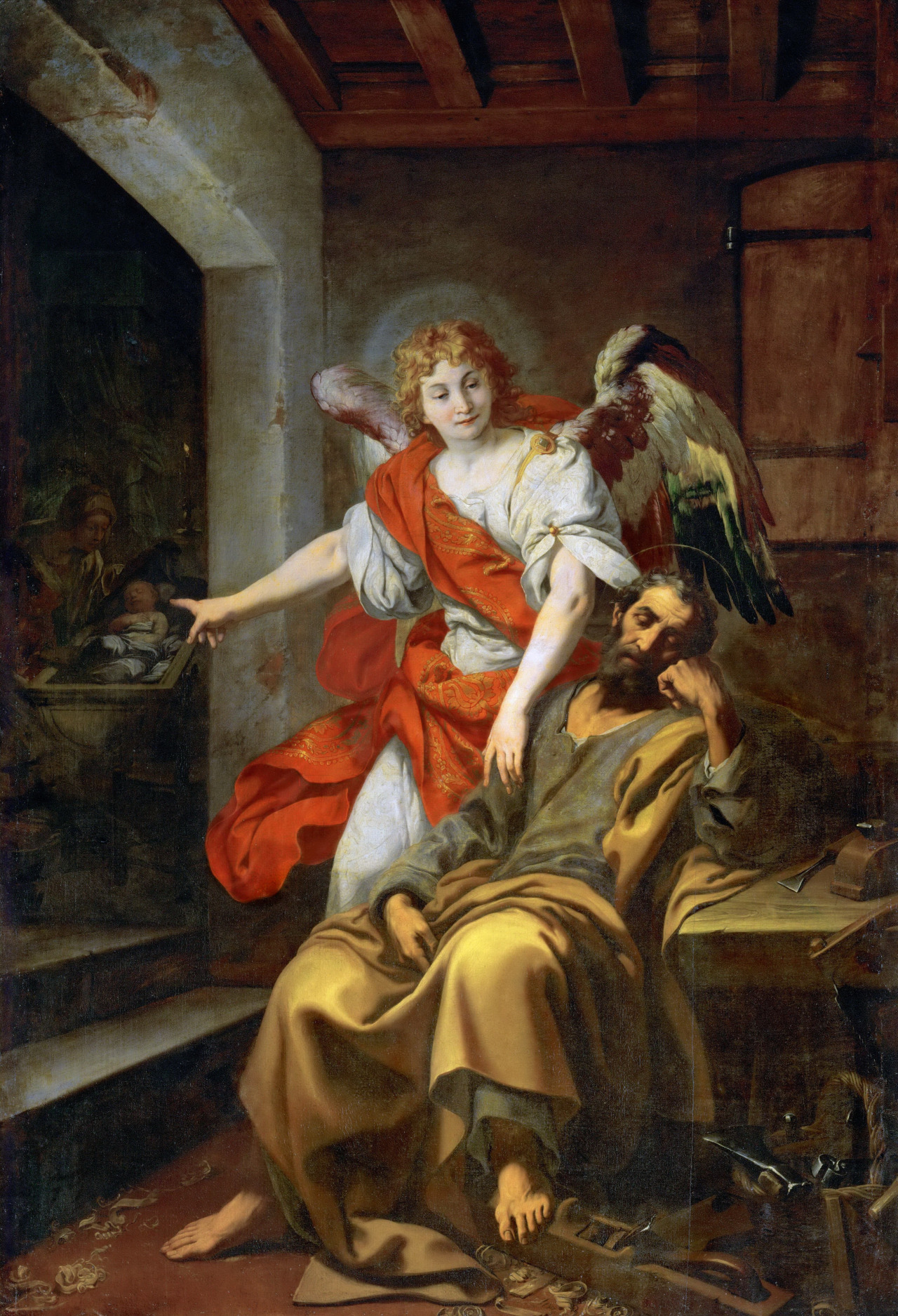
- Daniele Crespi's painting of an angel speaking to Joseph, 1620s
- Book: Gospel of Matthew
- Christian Bible part: New Testament

Matthew 2:19 is the nineteenth verse of the second chapter of the Gospel of Matthew in the New Testament. King Herod launched the Massacre of the Innocents in an attempt to kill the infant Jesus, but Joseph and his family, having been warned, have left for Egypt. In this verse, Joseph is again contacted by an angel and told that it is safe to return.

== Content ==
In the King James Version of the Bible, the text reads:

But when Herod was dead, behold,
an angel of the Lord appeareth
in a dream to Joseph in Egypt,

The World English Bible translates the passage as:

But when Herod was dead, behold,
an angel of the Lord appeared in
a dream to Joseph in Egypt, saying,

The Novum Testamentum Graece text is:

Τελευτήσαντος δὲ τοῦ Ἡρῴδου, ἰδοὺ
ἄγγελος Κυρίου φαίνεται
κατ’ ὄναρ τῷ Ἰωσὴφ ἐν Αἰγύπτῳ

For a collection of other versions see BibleHub Matthew 2:19.

== Analysis ==
Herod the Great is believed to have died in March or April of 4 BC and most estimates place Jesus at some two years of age at this point. Matthew does not describe Herod's gory death, which is vividly related by Josephus. This verse copies much of the wording of Matthew 2:13, and is the realization of the events promised there. The shift to the historic present tense marks this. This is the third time in the gospel in which an angel contacts Joseph in a dream the others appearing at Matthew 1:20 and Matthew 2:13.

John Calvin saw this verse as evidence that if one obeyed God's commands, as Joseph did when he fled to Egypt, and remained steadfast and patient, as Joseph did by staying in Egypt, one would eventually be rewarded.

== Commentary from the Church Fathers ==
Eusebius: For the sacrilege which Herod had committed against the Saviour, and his wicked slaughter of the infants of the same age, the Divine vengeance hastened his end; and his body, as Josephus relates, was attacked by a strange disease; so that the prophets declared that they were not human ailments, but visitations of Divine vengeance. Filled with mad fury, he gives command to seize and imprison the heads and nobles out of all parts of Judæa; ordering that as soon as ever he should breathe his last, they should be all put to death, that so Judæa though unwillingly might mourn at his decease. Just before he died he murdered his son Antipater, Such was the end of Herod, noticed in those words of the Evangelist, when Herod was dead, and such the punishment inflicted.

Jerome: Many here err from ignorance of history, supposing the Herod who mocked our Lord on the day of His passion, and the Herod whose death is here related, were the same. But the Herod who was then made friends with Pilate was the son of this Herod and brother to Archelaus; for Archelaus was banished to Lyons in Gaul, and his father Herod made king in his room, as we read in Josephus.

Preceded by Matthew 2:18	Gospel of Matthew; Chapter 2	Succeeded by Matthew 2:20
