= Matthew 2:22 =

- ← 2:21 2:23 →
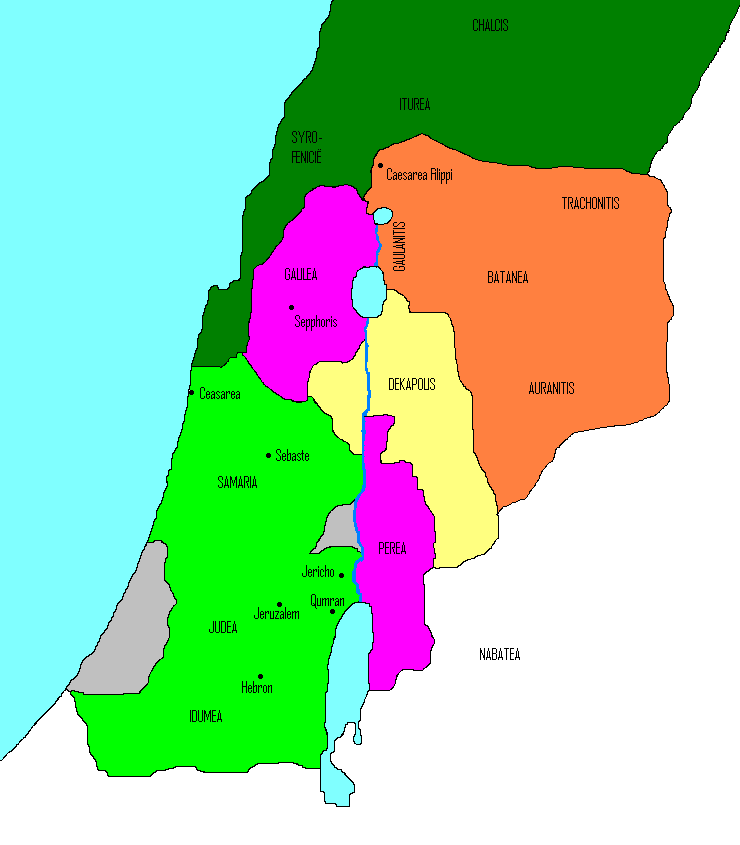
- The Division of Herod's Kingdom: Territory under Herod Archelaus, from 6 Iudaea Province Territory under Herod Antipas Territory under Philip Salome I (cities of Jabneh, Azotas, Phaesalis) Roman province of Syria Autonomous cities (Decapolis)
- Book: Gospel of Matthew
- Christian Bible part: New Testament

Matthew 2:22 is the twenty-second verse of the second chapter of the Gospel of Matthew in the New Testament. The young Jesus and the Holy Family have just left Egypt after hearing of the death of King Herod.

== Content ==
In the King James Version of the Bible the text reads:

But when he heard that Archelaus
did reign in Judaea in the room
of his father Herod, he was afraid
to go thither: notwithstanding,
being warned of God in a dream, he
turned aside into the parts of Galilee:

The World English Bible translates the passage as:

But when he heard that Archelaus
was reigning over Judea in the
place of his father, Herod, he
was afraid to go there. Being
warned in a dream, he withdrew
into the region of Galilee

The Novum Testamentum Graece text is:

ἀκούσας δὲ ὅτι Ἀρχέλαος
βασιλεύει τῆς Ἰουδαίας ἀντὶ τοῦ πατρὸς αὐτοῦ
Ἡρῴδου ἐφοβήθη ἐκεῖ ἀπελθεῖν
χρηματισθεὶς δὲ κατ’ ὄναρ ἀνεχώρησεν
εἰς τὰ μέρη τῆς Γαλιλαίας

For a collection of other versions see BibleHub Matthew 2:22

== Analysis ==
Upon Herod's death, his kingdom was divided into a tetrarchy. Judea was inherited by his son Herod Archelaus, while Galilee went to his younger son Herod Antipas. Joseph's decision to settle in Galilee rather than return to Judea thus reflects the unpopularity of Archelaus.

Unlike his father, Archelaus was granted the title ethnarch rather than king; hence, there have been several attempts to explain the discrepancy of the word βασιλεύει, with most scholars arguing that Matthew was being imprecise. Jones notes that Augustus' decision that Archelaus would only be granted the title of ethnarch occurred six months into his reign. Jones thus thinks it possible that during these first months Archelaus did call himself king, and it would have been during this period that Joseph returned from Egypt.

Joseph is again given important information in a dream. However, this time the author of Matthew does not report on its origin. The vocabulary of the passage and the previous instances make most scholars accept this to be another message from God.

None of this material is shared by the Gospel of Luke. Most scholars believe this is because Luke, who explains in detail why Mary and Joseph were in Bethlehem at the time of Jesus' birth, sees Nazareth as Joseph's original home, and thus sees no reason to explain why he returns there. Matthew apparently takes the opposite view, seeing Bethlehem as the family's original home, as demonstrated by them having a house in Matthew 2:11. The keyword is ἀνεχώρησεν, translated as withdrew. Gundry notes that Matthew would have used return if Nazareth was Joseph's original home and "withdrawing" implies leaving for a new location. Schweizer sees this as unambiguous proof that Matthew has Joseph originally from Bethlehem. France states that Matthew does not discuss Joseph's origin in Nazareth because of his "typical avoidance of unnecessary detail."

== Commentary from the Church Fathers ==
Josephus: Herod had nine wives, by seven of whom he had a numerous issue. By Josida, his first born Antipater—by Mariamine, Alexander and Aristobulus—by Mathuca, a Samaritan woman, Archelaus—by Cleopatra of Jerusalem, Herod, who was afterwards tetrarch, and Philip. The three first were put to death by Herod; and after his death, Archelaus seized the throne by occasion of his father's will, and the question of the succession was carried before Augustus Cæsar. After some delay, he made a distribution of the whole of Herod's dominions in accordance with the Senate's advice. To Archelaus he assigned one half, consisting of Idumæa and Judæa, with the title of tetrarch, and a promise of that of king if he showed himself deserving of it. The rest he divided into two tetrarchates, giving Galilee to Herod the tetrarch, Ituræa and Trachonitis to Philip. Thus Archelaus was after his father's death a duarch, which kind of sovereignty is here called a kingdom.

Augustine: Here it may be asked, How then could his parents go up every year of Christ's childhood to Jerusalem, as Luke relates, if fear of Archelaus now prevented them from approaching it? This difficulty is easily solved. At the festival they might escape notice in the crowd, and by returning soon, where in ordinary times they might be afraid to live. So they neither became irreligious by neglecting the festival, nor notorious by dwelling continually in Jerusalem. Or it is open to us to understand Luke when he says, they went up every year, as speaking of a time when they had nothing to fear from Archelaus, who, as Josephus relates, reigned only nine years. There is yet a difficulty in what follows; Being warned in a dream, he turned aside into the parts of Galilee. If Joseph was afraid to go into Judæa because one of Herod's sons, Archelaus, reigned there, how could he go into Galilee, where another of his sons Herod was tetrarch, as Luke tells us? As if the times of which Luke is speaking were times in which there was any longer need to fear for the Child, when even in Judæa things were so changed, that Archelaus no longer ruled there, but Pilate was governor.

Preceded by Matthew 2:21	Gospel of Matthew; Chapter 2	Succeeded by Matthew 2:23
