= Matthew 2:17 =

- ← 2:16 2:18 →
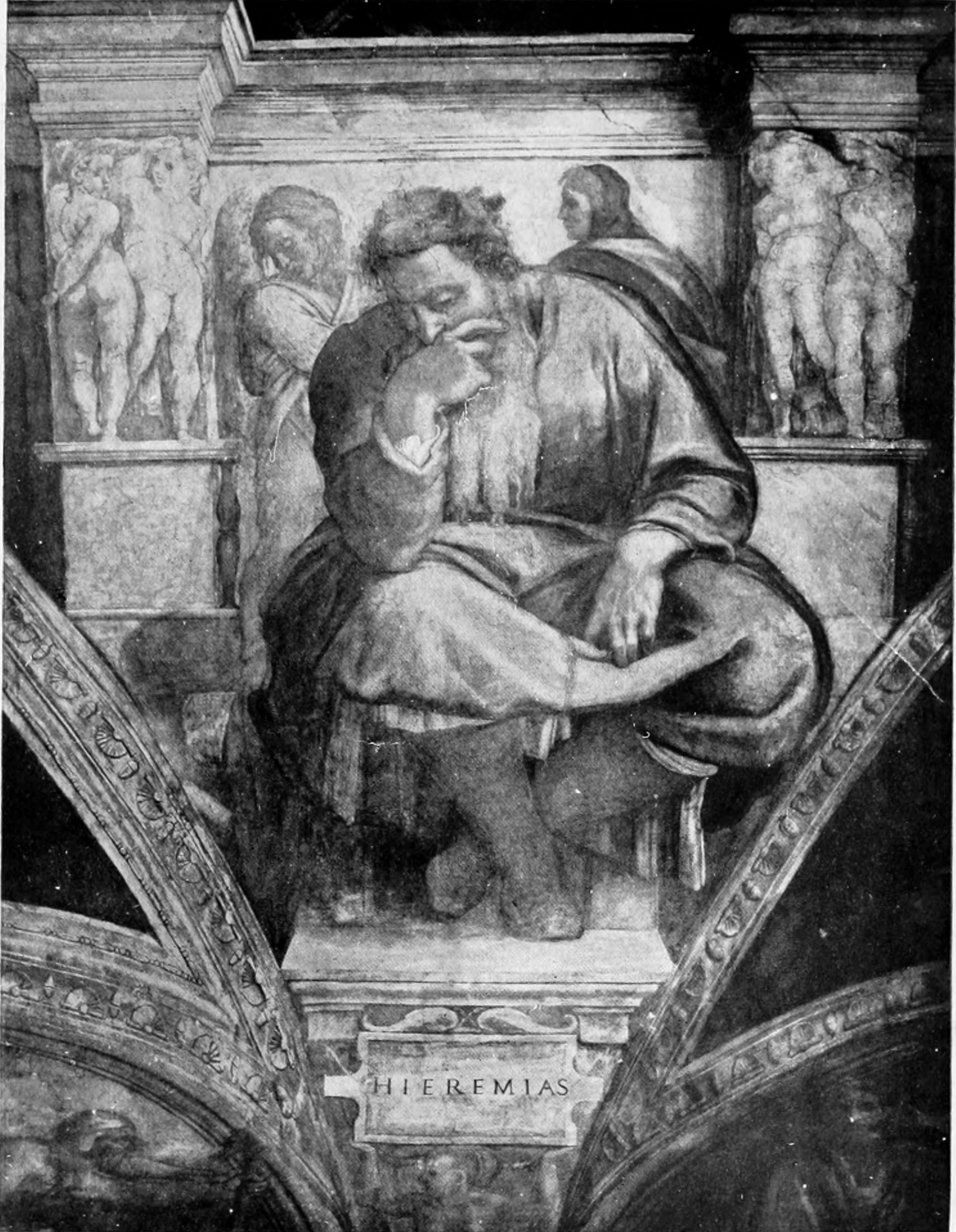
- The Prophet Jeremiah. Illustrations from The Life of Michael Angelo by Romain Rolland (1912).
- Book: Gospel of Matthew
- Christian Bible part: New Testament

Matthew 2:17 is the seventeenth verse of the second chapter of the Gospel of Matthew in the New Testament. Herod has ordered the Massacre of the Innocents and this verse links this event to a quotation from the Old Testament.

== Content ==
In the King James Version of the Bible the text reads:

Then was fulfilled that which was
spoken by Jeremiah the prophet, saying,

The World English Bible translates the passage as:

Then that which was spoken by Jeremiah
the prophet was fulfilled, saying,

The Novum Testamentum Graece text is:

τότε ἐπληρώθη τὸ ῥηθὲν
διὰ Ἰερεμίου τοῦ προφήτου λέγοντος

For a collection of other versions see BibleHub Matthew 2:17

== Analysis ==
The verse is setting up a quotation from Jeremiah 31:15 that appears in the next verse. Brown notes that the Old Syriac Sinaiticus states incorrectly that the quotation is from Isaiah. Isaiah is the Old Testament source Matthew most often refers to, but the verse in Matthew 2:18 clearly comes from Jeremiah. Some scholars feel that this error was probably in the original version of Matthew, but that it was corrected by later translators. Brown feels it is just as likely the error was made by whoever transcribed the OSS.

Normally Matthew does not mention which Old Testament book is being quoted. His standard format is to introduce an OT quotation by "so it might be fulfilled." In this verse he makes an exception to state that it is the words of a prophet being fulfilled. Schweizer believes this is an attempt to distance God from the Massacre of the Innocents by placing the prophet as an intermediate. This serves to reduce the impression that God mandated that the massacre take place.

These same lines reappear at Matthew 27:9 to again introduce a verse accredited to Jeremiah.

Preceded by Matthew 2:16	Gospel of Matthew; Chapter 2	Succeeded by Matthew 2:18
