= Madonna and Child with Saint Christopher and Saint Catherine =

Painting by Matteo di Giovanni

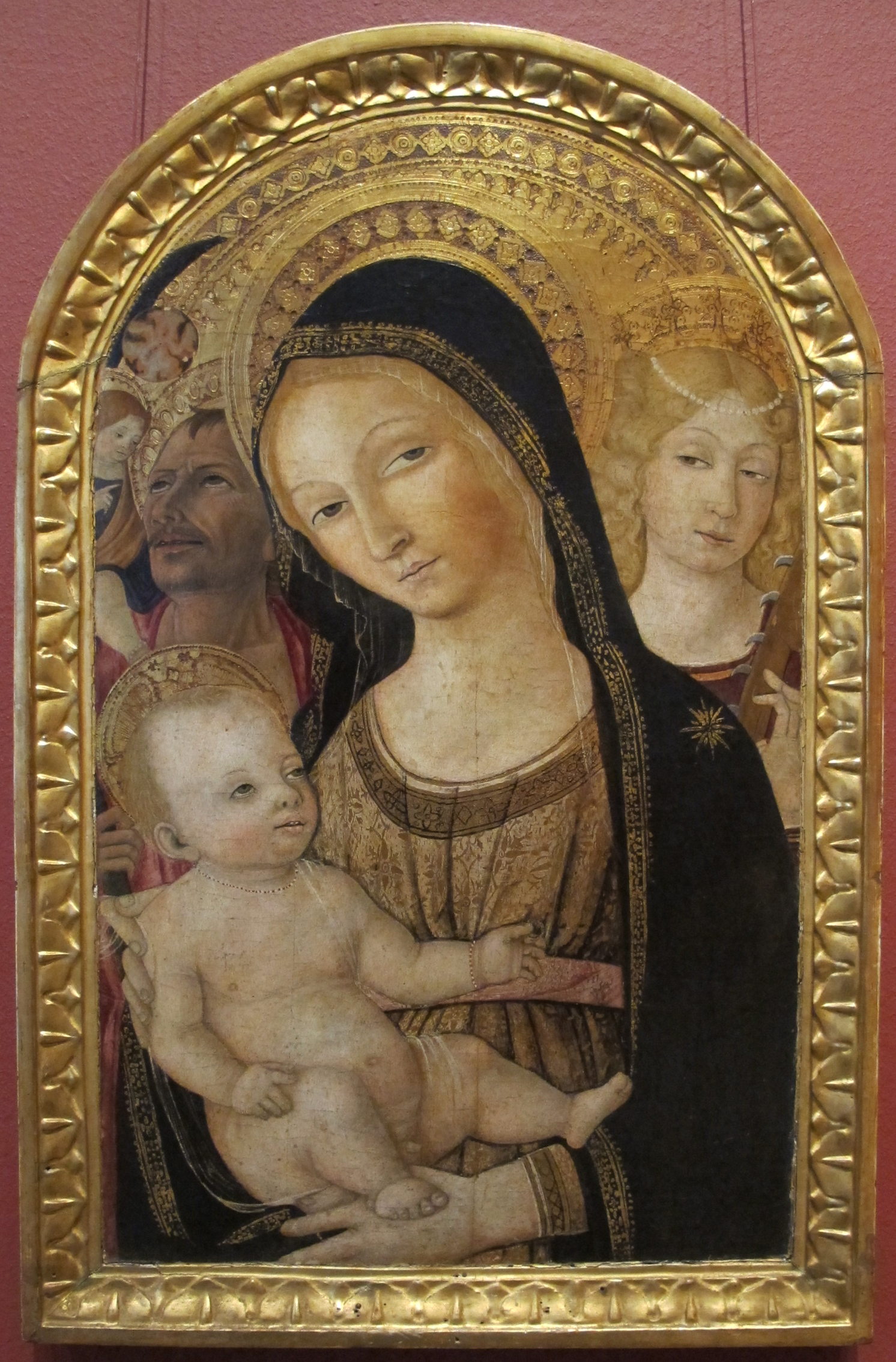
Madonna and Child with Saint Christopher and Saint Catherine (1490s) by Matteo di Giovanni

Madonna and Child with Saint Christopher and Saint Catherine is an oil on poplar panel painting by Matteo di Giovanni, created in the 1490s. It is held in the Pushkin Museum, in Moscow.

It was acquired between 1886 and 1898 in Italy by Dmitry Khomyakov, who donated it to the Rumyantsev Museum, which attributed it to Sano di Pietro until its fine arts curator Pavel Muratov reassigned it to Matteo di Giovanni. The museum was liquidated in 1924 and the work was reassigned to its present home.
