= Matthew 2:18 =

- ← 2:17 2:19 →
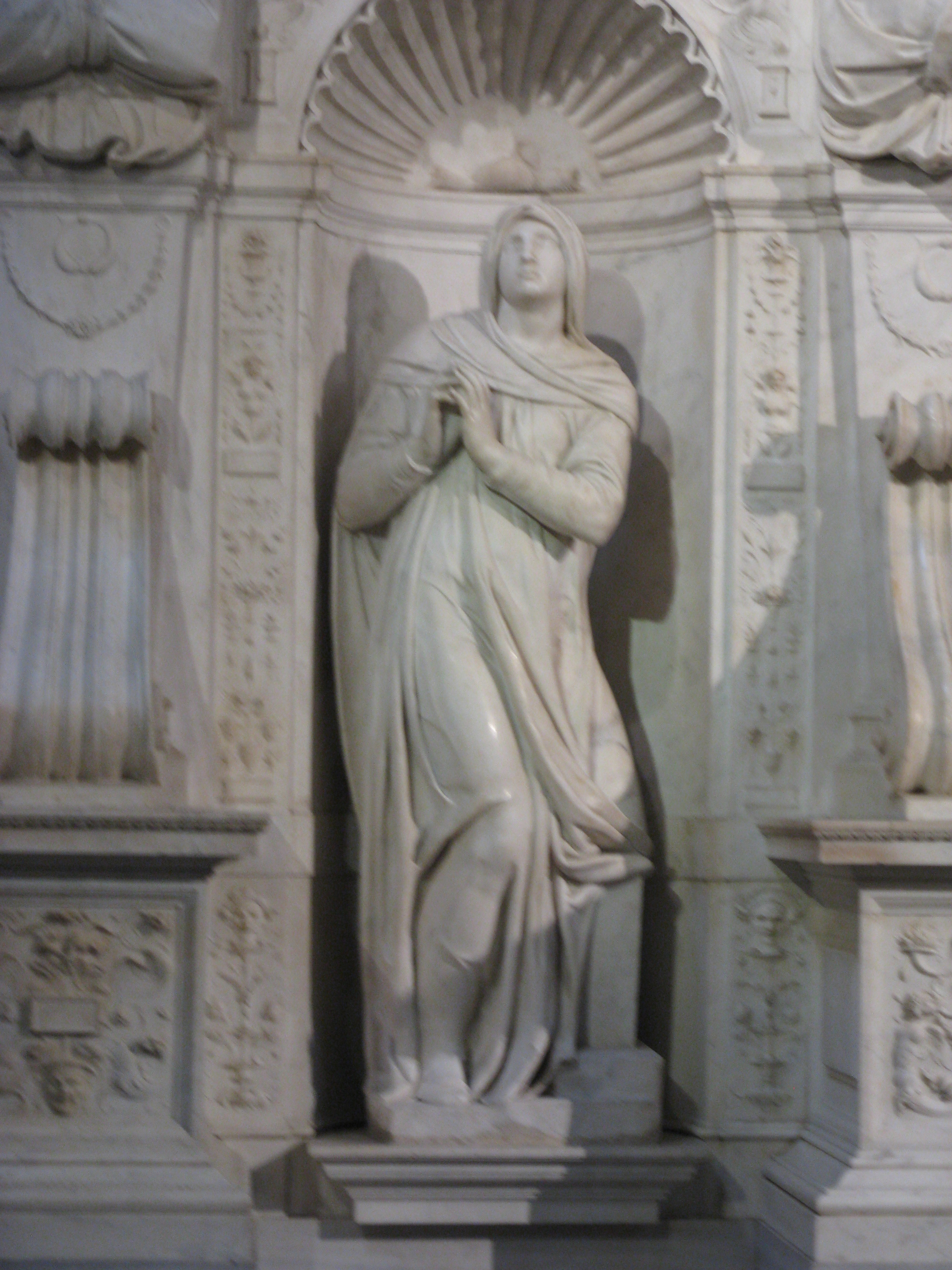
- Michelangelo's statue of Rachel
- Book: Gospel of Matthew
- Christian Bible part: New Testament

Matthew 2:18 is the eighteenth verse of the second chapter of the Gospel of Matthew in the New Testament. Herod has ordered the Massacre of the Innocents and this verse quotes from the Book of Jeremiah to show that this event was predicted by the prophets.

== Content ==
In the King James Version of the Bible the text reads:

In Rama was there a voice heard,
lamentation, and weeping, and
great mourning, Rachel weeping for
her children, and would not be
comforted, because they are not.

The World English Bible translates the passage as:

"A voice was heard in Ramah,
lamentation, weeping and great mourning,
Rachel weeping for her children;
she wouldn't be comforted,
because they are no more."

The Novum Testamentum Graece text is:

Φωνὴ ἐν Ῥαμὰ ἠκούσθη,
κλαυθμὸς καὶ ὀδυρμὸς πολύς·
Ῥαχὴλ κλαίουσα τὰ τέκνα αὐτῆς,
καὶ οὐκ ἤθελεν παρακληθῆναι ὅτι οὐκ εἰσίν.

For a collection of other versions see BibleHub Matthew 2:18

== Analysis ==
The verse is a quotation from Jeremiah 31:15. This is the first of three times Matthew quotes Jeremiah, the others being Matthew 16:14 and Matthew 24:9. The verse is similar to the Masoretic, but is not an exact copy implying that it could be a direct translation from the Hebrew. In Jeremiah this verse is a description of Rachel, the long dead mother of the northern tribes, mourning as her children are taken into captivity by the Assyrians. This mourning thus addresses the Massacre of the Innocents, but the reference to a forced exile can also refer to the Holy Family's Flight into Egypt.

This has long been considered one of Matthew's more elusive Old Testament references. Scholars have pointed out a number of problems with the context and original meaning. Rachel's tomb has long been associated with Bethlehem an important link between here and the massacre taking place there. However, Brown notes that this view is likely incorrect. Genesis reports that Rachel died and was buried while travelling to Bethlehem and implies that she was still some distance away from the town. In this verse the author of Jeremiah seems to be asserting that she was buried in Ramah, a town some five miles from Bethlehem. The Hebrew word Ramah could also be translated as "on high" and some versions of Jeremiah use this wording. "A voice was heard on high" would seem to fit more logically with Matthew's narrative, but it is fairly clear that the town is being referred to.

Another difficulty is that Bethlehem is in Judah, and thus its people were regarded as the children of Leah not Rachel. The verse is also taken somewhat out of context. The passage in Jeremiah is actually one of joy ending with the information that God had saved the Israelites and the children would be unharmed. This is not true of the children of Bethlehem who find no last minute succor. However, in the Catholic and Orthodox churches the Holy Innocents were proclaimed to all be saints, thus meeting Jeremiah's message of deliverance.

The most likely explanation however, is that Rachel represents her descendants more importantly the women of whom lost their children. The voice heard in Rama was that of the lamentation and weeping and great mourning taking place in Bethlehem. The outcry was so great that it was heard from over 5 miles away.

The most pertinent problem however is the fact that Jeremiah continues his narration in the consecutive verses Jeremiah 31:16-17, where the Lord says that the children will return from the enemy to their own land

== Commentary from the Church Fathers ==
Chrysostom: The Evangelist by this history of so bloody a massacre, having filled the reader with horror, now again soothes his feelings, showing that these things were not done because God could not hinder, or knew not of them; but as the Prophet had foretold.

Jerome: (In Hierem. 31:15.) This passage of Jeremiah has been quoted by Matthew neither according to the Hebrew nor the LXX (Septuagint) version. This shows that the Evangelists and Apostles did not follow any one's translation, but according to the Hebrew manner expressed in their own words what they had read in Hebrew.

Jerome: By Ramah we need not suppose that the town of that name near Gibeah is meant; but take it as signifying ‘high.’ A voice was heard ‘aloft,’ that is, spread far and wide.’

Pseudo-Chrysostom: Or, it was heard on high, because uttered for the death of the innocent, according to that, The voice of the poor entereth into the heavens. (Ecclus. 35:21.) The ‘weeping’ means the cries of the children; ‘lamentation,’ refers to the mothers. In the infants themselves their death ends their cries, in the mothers it is continually renewed by the remembrance of their loss.

Jerome: Rachel's son was Benjamin, in which tribe Bethlehem is not situated. How then does Rachel weep for the children of Judah as if they were her own? We answer briefly. She was buried near Bethlehem in Ephrata, and was regarded as the mother, because her body was there entertained. Or, as the two tribes of Judah and Benjamin were contiguous, and Herod's command extended to the coasts of Bethlehem as well as to the town itself, we may suppose that many were slain in Benjamin.

Pseudo-Augustine: Or, The sons of Benjamin, who were akin to Rachel, were formerly cut off by the other tribes, and so extinct both then and ever after. Then therefore Rachel began to mourn her sons, when she saw those of her sister cut off in such a cause, that they should be heirs of eternal life; for he who has experienced any misfortune, is made more sensible of his losses by the good fortune of a neighbour.

Saint Remigius: The sacred Evangelist adds, to show the greatness of the mourning, that even the dead Rachel was roused to mourn her sons, and would not be comforted because they were not.

Jerome: This may be understood in two ways; either she thought them dead for all eternity, so that no consolation could comfort her; or, she desired not to receive any comfort for those who she knew had gone into life eternal.

Hilary of Poitiers: It could not be that they were not who seemed now dead, but by glorious martyrdom they were advanced to eternal life; and consolation is for those who have suffered loss, not for those who have reaped a gain. Rachel affords a type of the Church long barren now at length fruitful. She is heard weeping for her children, not because she mourned them dead, but because they were slaughtered by those whom she would have retained as her first-born sons.

Rabanus Maurus: Or, The Church weeps the removal of the saints from this earth, but wishes not to be comforted as though they should return again to the struggles of life, for they are not to be recalled into life.

Glossa Ordinaria: She will not be comforted in this present life, for that they are not, but transfers all her hope and comfort to the life to come.

Rabanus Maurus: Rachel is well set for a type of the Church, as the word signifies ‘a sheep’ or ‘seeing;’ her whole thought being to fix her eye in contemplation of God; and she is the hundredth sheep that the shepherd layeth on his shoulder.

Preceded by Matthew 2:17	Gospel of Matthew; Chapter 2	Succeeded by Matthew 2:19
