= Matthew 2:23 =

- ← 2:22 3:1 →
- Francesco Conti's Return to Nazareth (1735).
- Book: Gospel of Matthew
- Christian Bible part: New Testament

Matthew 2:23 is the twenty-third (and the last) verse of the second chapter of the Gospel of Matthew in the New Testament. The young Jesus and the Holy Family have just returned from Egypt and in this verse are said to settle in Nazareth. This is the final verse of Matthew's infancy narrative.

Matthew ends the verse arguing that Jesus' life in Nazareth fulfilled a messianic prophecy, which he quotes: "He will be called a Nazarene." However, no such prophecy is found in the Old Testament, or any other extant source. Because of this, the verse has been much studied, and various theories have been advanced attempting to explain the enigmatic quote.

== Content ==
The original Koine Greek, according to Westcott and Hort, reads:

καὶ ἐλθὼν κατῴκησεν εἰς πόλιν λεγομένην
Ναζαρέτ, ὅπως πληρωθῇ τὸ ῥηθὲν διὰ τῶν
προφητῶν ὅτι Ναζωραῖος κληθήσεται.

In the Authorized King James Version of the Bible the text reads:

And he came and dwelt in a city
called Nazareth: that it might be
fulfilled which was spoken by the
prophets, He shall be called a Nazarene.

The World English Bible translates the passage as:

and came and lived in a city
called Nazareth; that it might be
fulfilled which was spoken through the
prophets: "He will be called a Nazarene."

William Tyndale's 1525/6 Bible translates the passage as:

and went and dwelt in a cite called Nazare-
th/to ffulfill that which was spoken be the pro-
phetes: he shal be called of Nazareth.

His 1534 revision (subtitled "The newe testament dylyngently corrected ...") translates the passage as:

& went & dwelt in a cite cal
led Nazareth/to fulfill yt which was spoken
by ye Prophetes: he shal be called a Nazarite

The 1535 Coverdale, 1537 Matthew, 1539 Taverner, 1540 Great, 1560 Geneva, 1568 Bishops', and 1582 Douay-Rheims Bibles, all repeat Tyndale's translation of "Ναζωραῖος" ("Nazōraios") as "Nazarite", but this was changed to "a Nazarene" in the 1611 King James Bible, in accordance with Strong's Concordance of the Bible.

== Interpretation ==
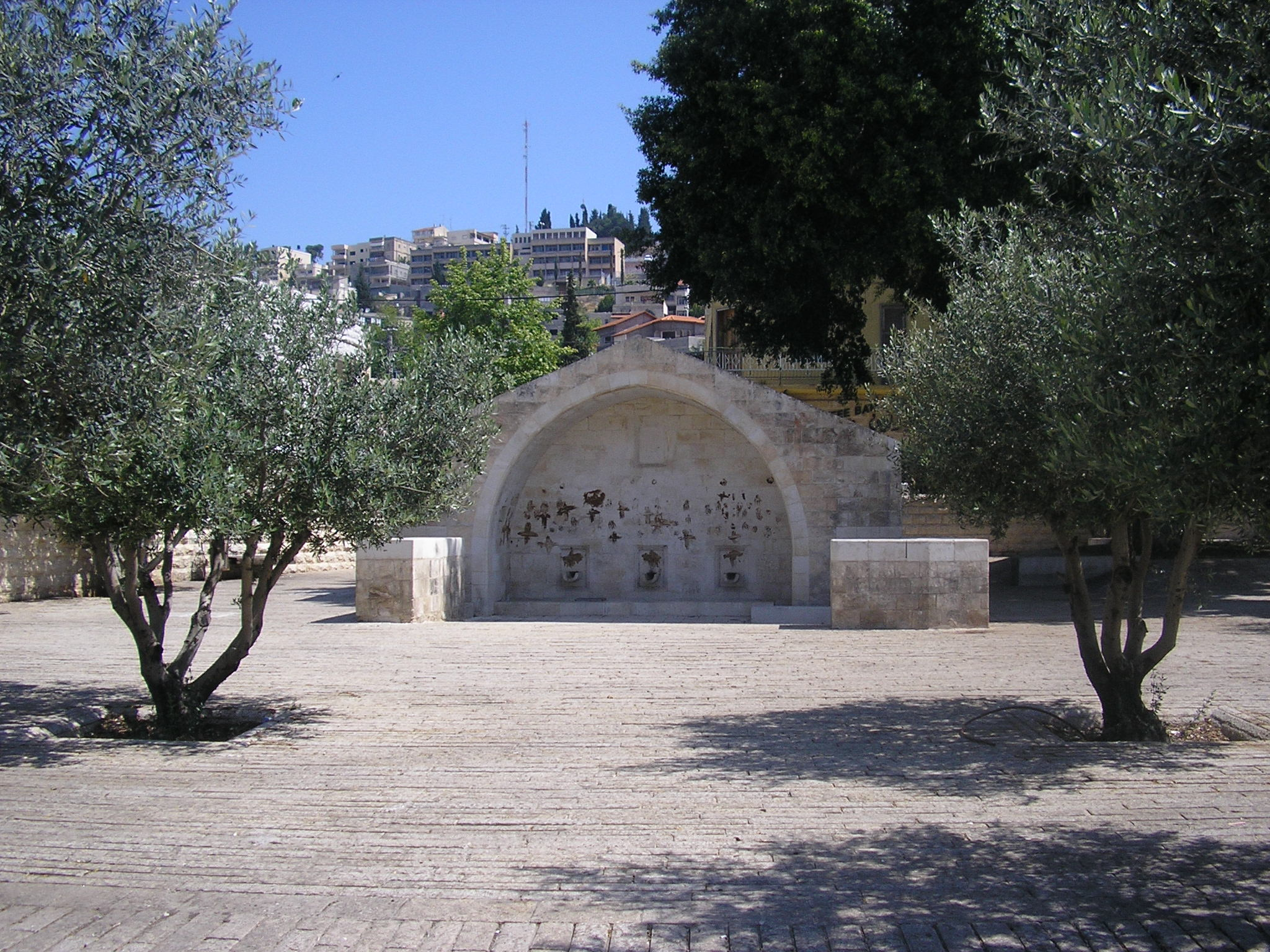
"Mary's Well" in Nazareth

Nazareth was a small village unmentioned in any writings before this time, though there is some archeological evidence that a village existed in the area at the time of Jesus. The word "town" is from the Greek polis, which is used both for a big city such as Jerusalem and quite small settlements. Matthew gives no specific reason for why the family moved to this town except for the prophecy fulfillment and does not show any knowledge that Luke has them originally from there. The town was near the Via Maris, the main road connecting to Egypt, and the route the family would have most likely been travelling.

Clarke notes that Nazareth was just to the north of the larger centre of Sepphoris that had been largely destroyed in the violence after the death of Herod the Great. At this time it was being rebuilt by Herod Antipas, and Clarke speculates that this could have been a source of employment for a carpenter such as Joseph. Nazareth could have had a population somewhere between 100 and 2000 people in the first century AD, and was quickly overshadowed by Sepphoris, which is only four miles away.

Jerome indicates that Nazareth was used in reference to Old Testament verses using the Hebrew word ne'tser (branch), specifically citing Isaiah 11:1. The Catholic Encyclopedia notes that, "The etymology of Nazara is netser, which means 'a shoot'. The Vulgate renders this word by flos, 'flower', in the Prophecy of Isaias (11:1), which is applied to the Saviour. St. Jerome (Epist., xlvi, 'Ad Marcellam') gives the same interpretation to the name of the town."

=== Analysis ===
The difficulty with the brief quote "he will be called a Nazarene" is that it occurs nowhere in the Old Testament prophets, or any other extant source. A number of theories have been advanced to explain this. At the time the canon was not firmly established and it is possible that Matthew is quoting some lost source, but all the other quotations in Matthew are from well known works, and if a quotation so closely linking Jesus’ hometown and the Messiah existed it would likely have been preserved.

There is much debate, and many theories among scholars as to what the quote could mean. Scholars have searched through the Old Testament for passages that are similar. One popular suggestion is Judges 13:5 where of Samson it says "the child shall be a 'Nazirite'" (Hebrew: נזיר nə-zîr; LXX: ναζιραιος, naziraios). A nazirite was a member of a sect who practiced asceticism, and the word has no known link to the name of the town. Jesus was not a nazirite and is never described as one. (Note: Quote: "… Matthew uses Nazōraios not naziraios, and that Jesus was never a nazirite anyway.") France also notes that Judges has "shall be" while Matthew has "shall be called", so if Matthew had been quoting Judges he would have retained the same form.

Another theory is that it is based on Isaiah 53:2. This messianic reference states that "he grew up before him like a tender shoot." One of the Hebrew words for "shoot" is netser (Hebrew: נצר nê-ṣer; cf. Isaiah 11:1), more similar to the word nazarene (Hebrew: נצרי netsri; Greek: Ναζωραῖος, Nazōraios) than nazirite (נזיר nezîr). Keener notes that the term is used to refer to the Messiah in the Dead Sea Scrolls. However this piece of wordplay is meaningless in Greek. However, there are other wordplays in Matthew that only makes sense in the Hebrew. In 1:21, the angel says his name will be Ιησους because he will σωσει. This only makes sense based on the Hebrew ישׁוּע Yeshua from the verb ישׁע "to save." Goulder feels that the author of Matthew felt it essential that Jesus' hometown be justified in prophecy and he thus looked for the closest thing he could find, which was this verse. However, the main problem with this argument is that the Hebrew word for "shoot" in verse 53:2 is not "natsir" but "yowneq" which further complicates the issue.

This verse refers to prophets in the plural, unlike all of Matthew's other references to known Old Testament prophets, which use the singular. This could imply that the wordplay and multiple interpretations was intentional. Rothfuchs reads the plural as the author of Matthew referring to all the quotes so far in the Gospel that directed the Holy Family in travels. To him the line is thus not a direct quote from the prophets, but the inevitable end the previous directions led to.

France states that Matthew sees Nazareth, as an obscure city, causes the term "Nazarene" to be understood as an insulting epithet (cf. John 1:46), an unflattering reference to Jesus' humble and obscure origins that was used by anti-Christians at the time. The word is used in just such a way at Matthew 26:71. Gundry point out that the wordplay netzer in Isaiah 11:1 conveys the same message by depicting the Messiah as a shoot from a cut-down stump to be a symbol of lowly origin, as so understood by the Jewish at that time.

According to the American theologian Albert Barnes, the author of Matthew 2:23 is referencing the numerous prophecies in the Old Testament which describe the coming messiah's lowly background:

4. The character of the people of Nazareth was such that they were proverbially despised and contemned, John 1:46; John 7:52. To come from Nazareth, therefore, or to be a Nazarene, was the same as to be despised, or to be esteemed of low birth; to be a root out of dry ground, having no form or comeliness. This was what had been predicted by all the prophets. When Matthew says, therefore, that the prophecies were “fulfilled,” his meaning is, that the predictions of the prophets that he would be of a low and despised condition, and would be rejected, were fully accomplished in his being an inhabitant of Nazareth, and despised as such.

— https://www.studylight.org/bible/eng/wyc/matthew/2-23.html#geb

== Commentary from the Church Fathers ==
Glossa Ordinaria: But then we might ask, why was he not afraid to go into Galilee, seeing Archelaus ruled there also? He could be better concealed in Nazareth than in Jerusalem, which was the capital of the kingdom, and where Archelaus was constantly resident.

Chrysostom: And when he had once left the country of His birth, all the occurrences passed out of mind; the rage of persecution had been spent in Bethlehem and its neighbourhood. By choosing Nazareth therefore, Joseph both avoided danger, and returned to his country.

Augustine: This may perhaps occur to some, that Matthew says His parents went with the Child Jesus to Galilee because they feared Archelaus, when it should seem most probable that they chose Galilee because Nazareth was their own city, as Luke has not forgot to mention. We must understand, that when the Angel in the vision in Egypt said to Joseph, Go into the land of Israel, Joseph understood the command to be that he should go straight into Judæa, that being properly the land of Israel. But finding Archelaus ruling there, he would not court the danger, as the land of Israel might be interpreted to extend to Galilee, which was inhabited by children of Israel. Or we may suppose His parents supposed that Christ should dwell no where but in Jerusalem, where was the temple of the Lord, and would have gone thither had not the fear of Archelaus hindered them. And they had not been commanded from God to dwell positively in Judæa, or Jerusalem, so as that they should have despised the fear of Archelaus, but only in the land of Israel generally, which they might understand of Galilee.

Hilary of Poitiers: But the figurative interpretation holds good any way. Joseph represents the Apostles, to whom Christ is entrusted to be borne about. These, as though Herod were dead, that is, his people being destroyed in the Lord's passion, are commanded to preach the Gospel to the Jews; they are sent to the lost sheep of the house of Israel. But finding the seed of their hereditary unbelief still abiding, they fear and withdraw; admonished by a vision, to wit, seeing the Holy Ghost poured upon the Gentiles, they carry Christ to them.

Rabanus Maurus: Or, we may apply it to the last times of the Jewish Church, when many Jews having turned to the preaching of Enoch and Elijah, the rest filled with the spirit of Antichrist shall fight against the faith. So that part of Judæa where Archelaus rules, signifies the followers of Antichrist; Nazareth of Galilee, whither Christ is conveyed, that part of the nation that shall embrace the faith. Galilee means ‘removal;’ Nazareth, ‘the flower of virtues;’ for the Church the more zealously she removes from the earthly to the heavenly, the more she abounds in the flower and fruit of virtues.

Glossa Ordinaria: To this he adds the Prophet's testimony, saying, That it might be fulfilled which was spoken by the Prophets, &c.

Jerome: Had he meant to quote a particular text, he would not have written ‘Prophets,’ but ‘the Prophet.’ By thus using the plural he evidently does not take the words of any one passage in Scripture, but the sense of the whole. Nazarene is interpreted ‘Holy,’ and that the Lord would be Holy, all Scripture testifies. Otherwise we may explain that it is found in Isaiah (c. 11:1.) rendered to the strict letter of the Hebrew. There shall come a Rod out of the stem of Jesse, and a Nazarene shall grow out of His roots.

Pseudo-Chrysostom: They might have read this in some Prophets who are not in our canon, as Nathan or Esdras. That there was some prophecy to this purport is clear from what Philip says to Nathanael. Him of whom Moses in the Law and the Prophets did write, Jesus of Nazareth. (John 1:45.) Hence the Christians were at first called Nazarenes, at Antioch their name was changed to that of ‘Christians.’

Augustine: The whole of this history, from the account of the Magi inclusively, Luke omits. Let it be here noticed once for all, that each of the Evangelists writes as if he were giving a full and complete history, which omits nothing; where he really passes over anything, he continues his thread of history as if he had told all. Yet by a diligent comparison of their several narratives, we can be at no loss to know where to insert any particular that is mentioned by one and not by the other.

== Sources ==
- Allison, Dale C. Jr. (2007). "57. Matthew". In Barton, John; Muddiman, John (eds.). The Oxford Bible Commentary (first (paperback) ed.). Oxford University Press. ISBN 978-0199277186.
- France, R.T. (1985). The Gospel According to Matthew: An Introduction and Commentary. Tyndale New Testament commentaries. Vol. 1. Wm. B. Eerdmans Publishing. ISBN 9780802800633.
- France, R.T. (2007). Bruce, Frederick Fyvie (ed.). The Gospel of Matthew. New international commentary on the New Testament. Wm. B. Eerdmans Publishing. ISBN 9780802825018.

Preceded by Matthew 2:22	Gospel of Matthew; Chapter 2	Succeeded by Matthew 3:1
