= Matthew 2:20–21 =

- ← 2:19 2:22 →
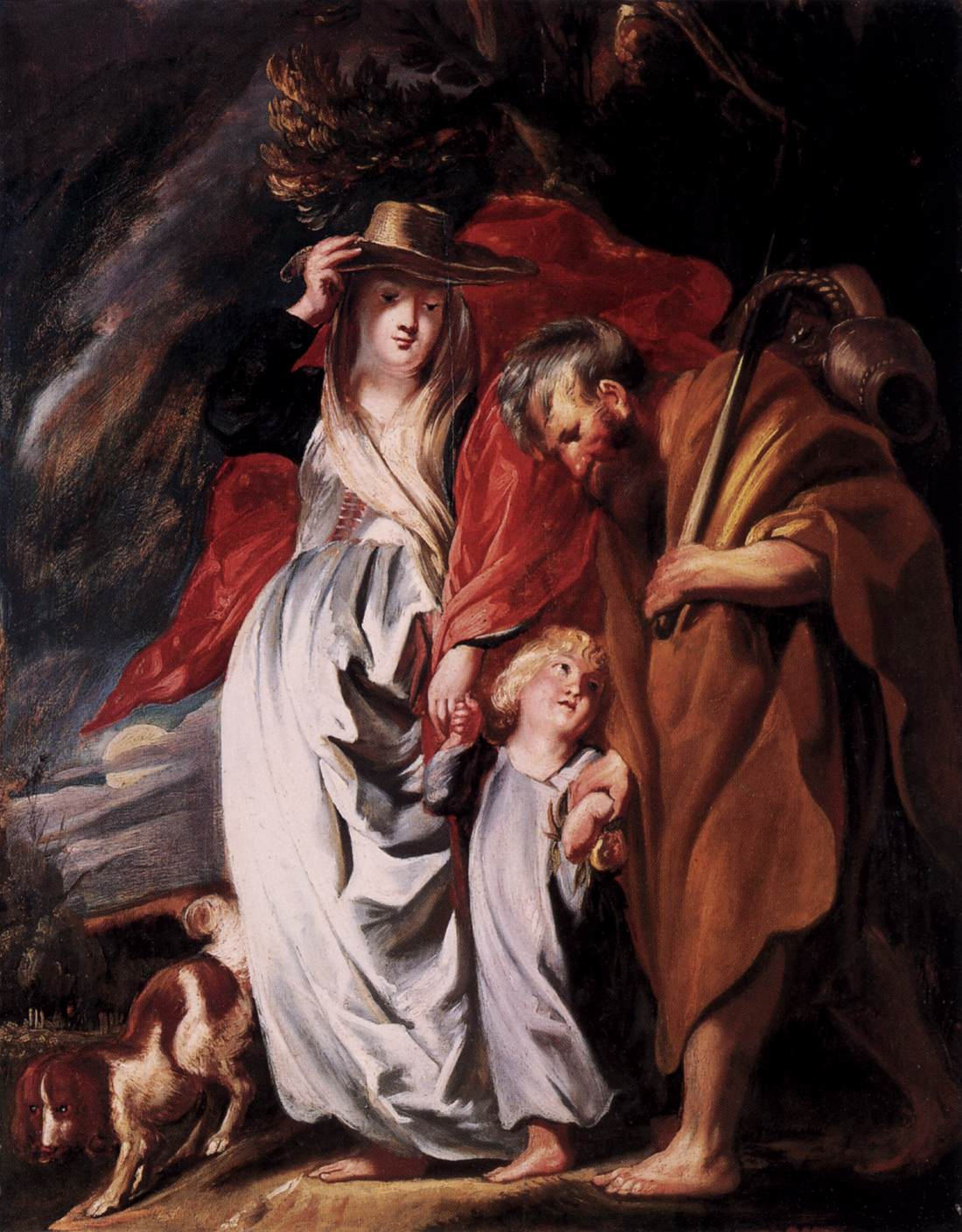
- Jacob Jordaens's The Return of the Holy Family from Egypt
- Book: Gospel of Matthew
- Christian Bible part: New Testament

Matthew 2:20 and 2:21 are the twentieth and twenty first verses of the second chapter of the Gospel of Matthew in the New Testament. The young Jesus and the Holy Family are in Egypt. An angel has just informed Joseph that King Herod, his persecutor, is dead. In this verse the angel gives him further instructions. The wording of this verse is extremely close to that of Exodus 4:19.

== Text ==
In the King James Version of the Bible the text reads:

20: Saying, Arise, and take the young
child and his mother, and go into
the land of Israel: for they are dead
21: which sought the young child's life.
And he arose, and took the young child and
his mother, and came into the land of Israel.

The World English Bible translates the passage as:

20: "Arise and take the young child
and his mother, and go into the
land of Israel, for those who sought
the young child's life are dead."
21: He arose and took the young child and
his mother, and came into the land of Israel.

The Novum Testamentum Graece text is:

20:λέγων Ἐγερθεὶς παράλαβε τὸ παιδίον
καὶ τὴν μητέρα αὐτοῦ καὶ πορεύου εἰς γῆν Ἰσραήλ
τεθνήκασιν γὰρ οἱ ζητοῦντες τὴν ψυχὴν τοῦ παιδίου.
21:ὁ δὲ ἐγερθεὶς παρέλαβεν τὸ παιδίον
καὶ τὴν μητέρα αὐτοῦ καὶ εἰσῆλθεν εἰς γῆν Ἰσραήλ.

For a collection of other versions see BibleHub Matthew 2:20, 2:21.

== Interpretation ==
Like the rest of the infancy narrative, these verses are careful to not refer to Jesus as Joseph's child. The angel refers to him as "the young child" not "your young child", but freely refers to Mary as his mother.

The main point of contention with this passage is why it refers to multiple people being dead when only Herod has died. The plural is unambiguous in the original Greek and in all surviving versions. This may link with the earlier part of the chapter where Herod colludes with the Jewish leaders to kill Jesus, but is unlikely the leaders would all have died in this brief period, and historical records demonstrates that many remained in office throughout this era. A number of explanations have been advanced to explain this problem. One proposal is that there was a secondary figure who died at the time. The most mentioned candidate being Herod's son Antipater, who died five days before the king. The problem with this theory is that there is no evidence in Matthew, or any other contemporary work, that Antipater had any involvement in the persecutions. The standard explanation is that most scholars believe the plural is due to Matthew's basing this section on Exodus. Raymond E. Brown sees this as an unlikely explanation. He argues that the author of Matthew was competent enough to change to the singular if he had so desired. Brown argues that the passage should more accurately be read as "the plot by those who wanted to kill is dead."

Jerome, referring to this passage stated, "From this we see that not Herod only, but also the Priests and Scribes had sought the Lord’s death at that time." While Saint Remigius stated, "But if they were many who sought his destruction, how came they all to have died in so short a time? As we have related before, all the great men among the Jews were slain at Herod’s death."

Robert H. Gundry notes that the phrase translated as "child's life" literally means "child's soul." At the time seeking someone's soul was an expression for trying to kill someone.

The reference to "Land of Israel" in this verse and the next one is important. This is the only place in the New Testament where this phrase is used, i.e. the only place where "Israel" is used to refer to a geographic location, a usage which was common in the Book of Exodus on which this passage is based. This is the usage that is employed today by the State of Israel. The word translated as land can also be translated as state or country. Elsewhere in the New Testament the term Israel more often taken to refer to the kingdom of God or the Jewish people as a whole. Gundry notes that the author of Matthew rejects the more accurate terminology "land of Judah" as he was looking for a term that would encompass both Judah and Galilee, where the family would end up.

Verse 21 is an almost exact copy of verse 20, except it is in the past tense. It is also very similar to Matthew 2:14. The similarity to the last verse shows that Joseph promptly and exactly obeys the instructions of the angel, obedience is an important virtue throughout Matthew.

== Commentary from the Church Fathers ==
Pseudo-Dionysius: See how Jesus Himself, though far above all celestial beings, and coming unchanged to our nature, shunned not that ordinance of humanity which He had taken on Him, but was obedient to the dispositions of His Father made known by Angels. For even by Angels is declared to Joseph the retreat of the Son into Egypt, so ordained of the Father, and His return again to Judæa.

Pseudo-Chrysostom: See how Joseph was set for ministering to Mary; when she went into Egypt and returned, who would have fulfilled to her this so needful ministry, had she not been betrothed? For to outward view Mary nourished and Joseph defended the Child; but in truth the Child supported His mother and protected Joseph. Return into the land of Israel; for He went down into Egypt as a physician, not to abide there, but to succour it sick with error. But the reason of the return is given in the words, They are dead, &c.

Jerome: From this we see that not Herod only, but also the Priests and Scribes had sought the Lord's death at that time.

Saint Remigius: But if they were many who sought his destruction, how came they all to have died in so short a time? As we have related above, all the great men among the Jews were slain at Herod's death.

Pseudo-Chrysostom: And that is said to have been done by the counsel of God for their conspiring with Herod against the Lord; as it is said, Herod was troubled, and all Jerusalem with him.

Saint Remigius: Or the Evangelist uses a figure of speech, by which the plural is used for the singular. These words, the Child's life, overthrow those heretics who taught that Christ did not take a soul, but had His Divinity in place of a soul.

Bede: This slaughter of the infants for the Lord's sake, the death of Herod soon after, and Joseph's return with the Lord and his mother to the land of Israel, is a figure showing that all the persecutions moved against the Church will be avenged by the death of the persecutor, peace restored to the Church, and the saints who had concealed themselves return to their own places. Or the return of Jesus to the land of Israel on the death of Herod shows, that, at the preaching of Enoch and Elijah, the Jews, when the fire of modern jealousy shall be extinguished, shall receive the true faith.

Glossa Ordinaria: Joseph was not disobedient to the angelic warning, but he arose, and took the young Child and his mother, and came into the land of Israel. The Angel had not fixed the particular place, so that while Joseph hesitates, the Angel returns, and by the often visiting him confirms his obedience.

Preceded by Matthew 2:19	Gospel of Matthew; Chapter 2	Succeeded by Matthew 2:22
