= Massacre of the Innocents (Matteo di Giovanni) =

Painting by Matteo di Giovanni

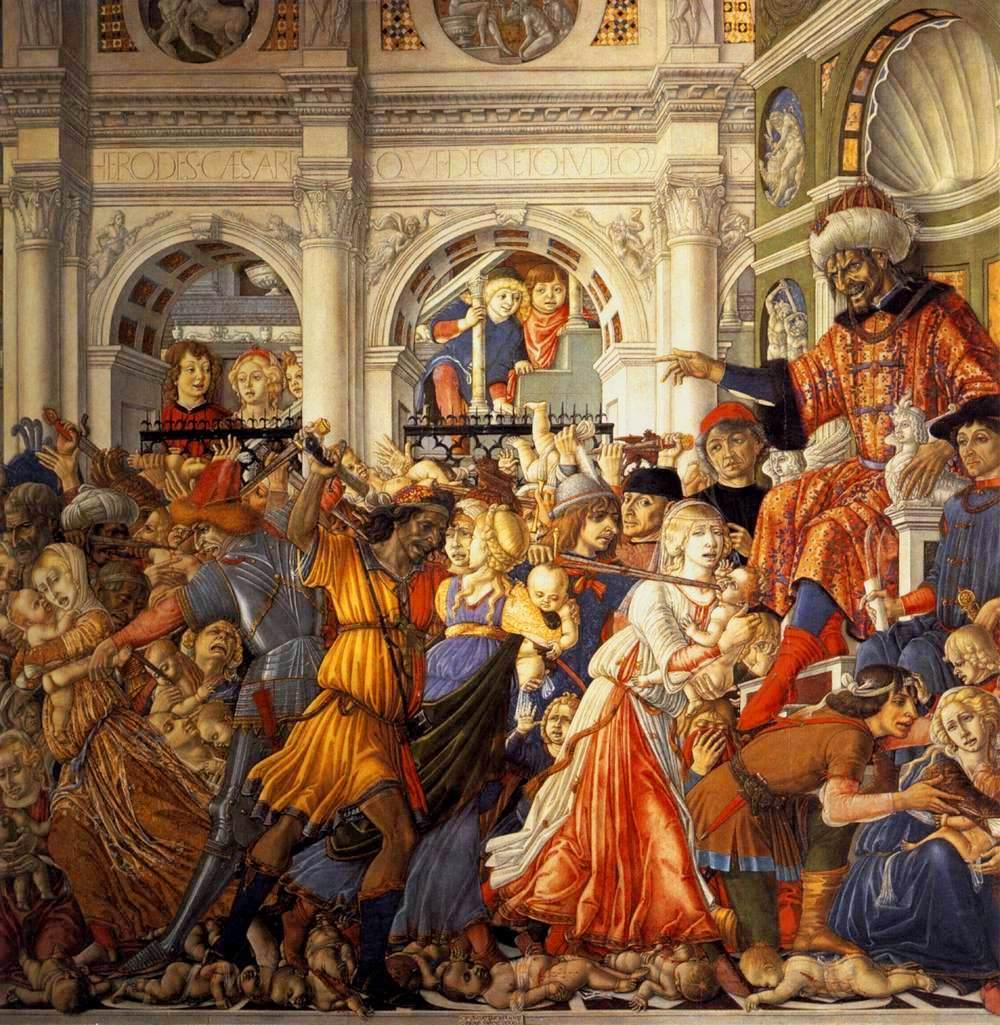

Massacre of the Innocents is a tempera on panel painting by Matteo di Giovanni, produced between 1450 and 1500 possibly in 1468, 1478, or 1488) probably in Siena. It was commissioned by Alfonso II of Naples, then living in Siena as part of the campaign against the Medici. It was probably produced to commemorate the inhabitants of Otranto killed by the Ottomans in 1480 whose relics were moved into the church of Santa Caterina at Formiello at Alfonso's request - the same church also originally housed the painting. It is now in the National Museum of Capodimonte.

== Bibliography ==
- Mario Sapio, Il Museo di Capodimonte, Napoli, Arte'm, 2012. ISBN 978-88-569-0303-4
- Touring Club Italiano, Museo di Capodimonte, Milano, Touring Club Editore, 2012. ISBN 978-88-365-2577-5
