= Matteo di Giovanni =

Italian painter (c. 1430–1495)

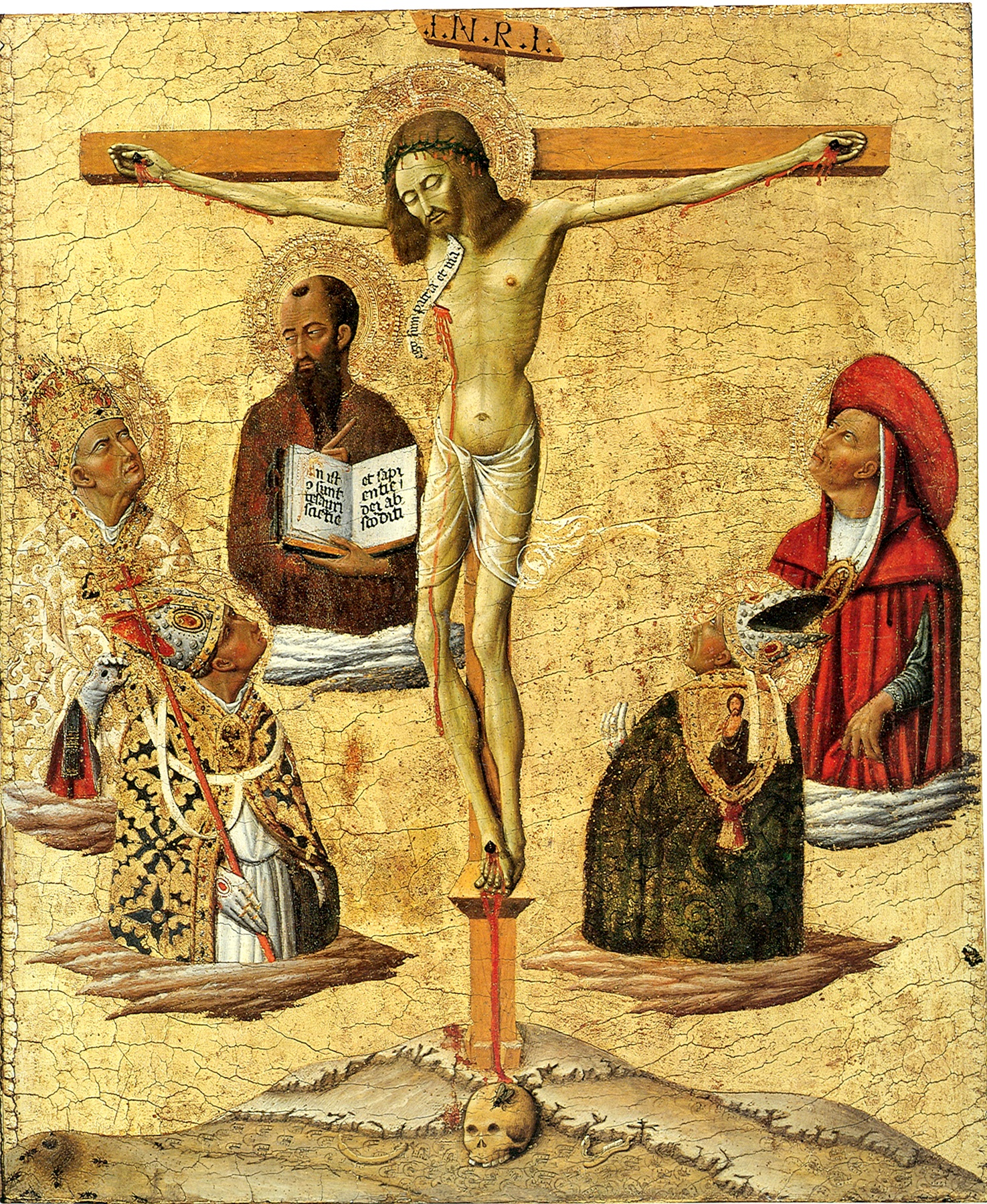
Mystical Crucifixion by Matteo di Giovanni, Princeton University Art Museum, 1450

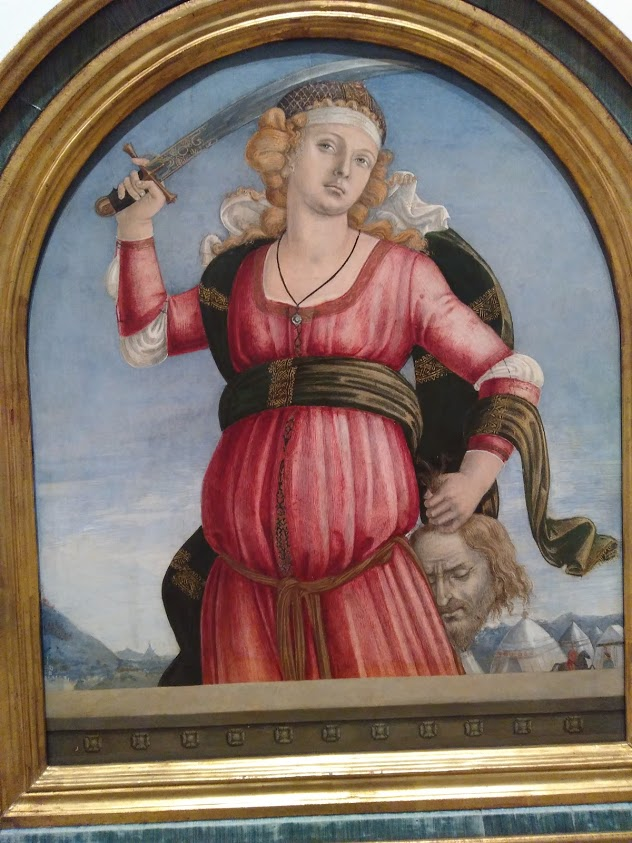
Judith with the Head of Holofernes, painted between c. 1490 and c. 1495 (Eskenazi Museum of Art)

Matteo di Giovanni (c. 1430 – 1495) was an Italian Renaissance artist from the Sienese School.

== Biography ==
Matteo di Giovanni di Bartolo was born in Borgo Sansepolcro around 1430. His family relocated to Siena and he is firmly associated with the art of that city. Matteo was twice married—first in 1463 to a wealthy noble woman and, after her death, to a rich widow, who made it possible for Matteo to buy real estate and by whom he fathered many children.

Documentation concerning the early phases of Matteo's life and career as an artist is scanty and nothing is recorded about his apprenticeship. Left to conjecture, we might imagine him as having been trained in the workshop of sculptor/painter Lorenzo di Pietro, better known as Vecchietta but he clearly was influenced by Stefano di Giovanni, called Sassetta and Domenico di Bartolo. The miniaturist Girolamo da Cremona and the Florentine painter Antonio del Pollaiuolo also seemed to have contributed to Matteo's distinctive style. In 1452, Matteo entered into partnership with the painter Giovanni di Pietro, and the two shared living quarters in the San Salvatore neighborhood of Siena in 1453. That Matteo, at this time, is recorded as having colored and gilded a sculpture of the Archangel Gabriel by the celebrated Sienese sculptor Jacopo della Quercia is a reminder of the sort of tasks performed by an artist in the 15th century. Matteo and Giovanni also collaborated in the embellishment of organ shutters in the Siena Cathedral and in the decoration of the San Bernardino Chapel in that cathedral.

That Matteo had succeeded in establishing an artistic reputation is demonstrated by his selection as one of four Sienese painters who were to furnish altarpieces for the chapels of the Pienza Cathedral erected as part of the urban renewal of the town. For this prestigious commission Matteo painted three altarpieces. Dating to the years 1460–62, these paintings offer a secure point from which to evaluate Matteo's early style and to reconstruct his development as an artist.

The three paintings in Pienza also help to explain the next phase in his style. The first of these altarpieces, a large Madonna and Saints signed "Opus Matthei Johannis De Senis" depicts the enthroned Madonna surrounded by Sts. Catherine, Matthew, Bartholomew, and Lucy. The composition and figure types are reminiscent of those found in Sano di Pietro's paintings while the draperies recall the work of Vecchietta and the St. Catherine type is derived from Domenico di Bartolo. Above this panel, in a lunette, is a Flagellation of Christ scene, which, with its violent action, twisted but anatomically correct bodies, and volumetric plasticity, shows a familiarity with the progressive Florentine draftsmanship of Pollaiuolo.

Work from Matteo's middle period includes an altarpiece dated to 1477 for the oratory of Santa Maria delle Nevi in Siena; the altarpiece of Santa Barbara, dated to 1478–79 commissioned by the baker's guild for their chapel in the Church of San Domenico, Siena; and what is considered Matteo di Giovanni's masterpiece, the Massacre of the Innocents, which is signed and dated 1482.

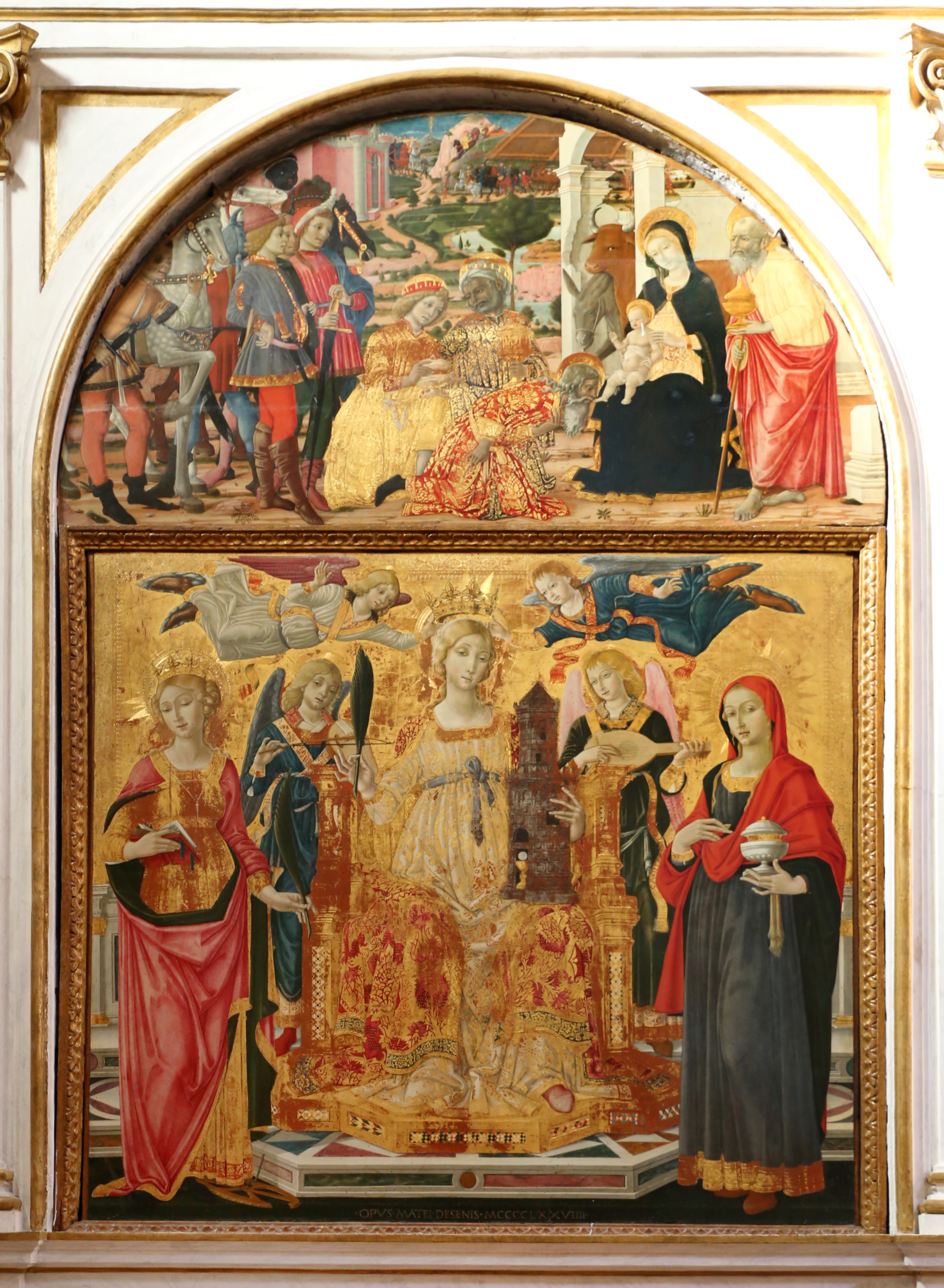
Matteo di Giovanni, Santa Barbara with Mary Magdalene and Catherine of Alessandria, c. 1478

During his mature period, Matteo began to paint idyllic and naturalistic landscape scenes employing delicate, lyrical colors derived from the Umbrian school of painting. Matteo's brand of eclecticism tended to evolve from local taste and tradition. For this reason it is not surprising to find him producing delicate, sweet panels of the Madonna and Child, such as the panel from the Kress Collection now in the Columbia Museum of Art, depicting the Madonna and child with Saints Sebastian and Catherine of Siena and the Madonna and Child with Saint Christopher and Saint Catherine now in the Pushkin Museum in Moscow, at almost the same moment that he was painting Judith with the Head of Holofernes (c.1490) now in the Indiana University Art Museum, Bloomington and the horrific events of The Massacre of the Innocents.

Matteo di Giovanni died in Siena in 1495. He is credited with teaching Guidoccio Cozzarelli (1450–1516/17) of Siena, an altarpiece painter and miniaturist.

== Gallery ==
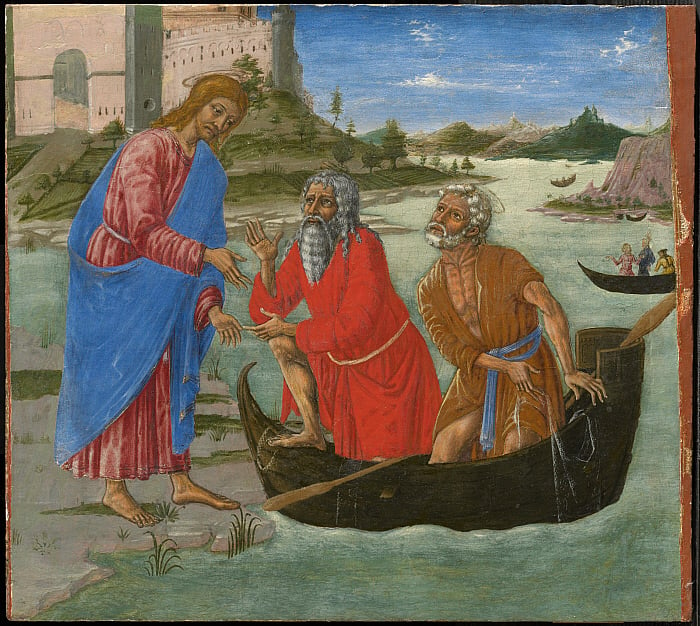
The Calling of Saints Peter and Andrew (1470s), tempera with oil and gold on panel, 11 9/16 x 12 7/8 in. (29.3 x 32.7 cm), Clark Art Institute
