= Chronology of Jesus =

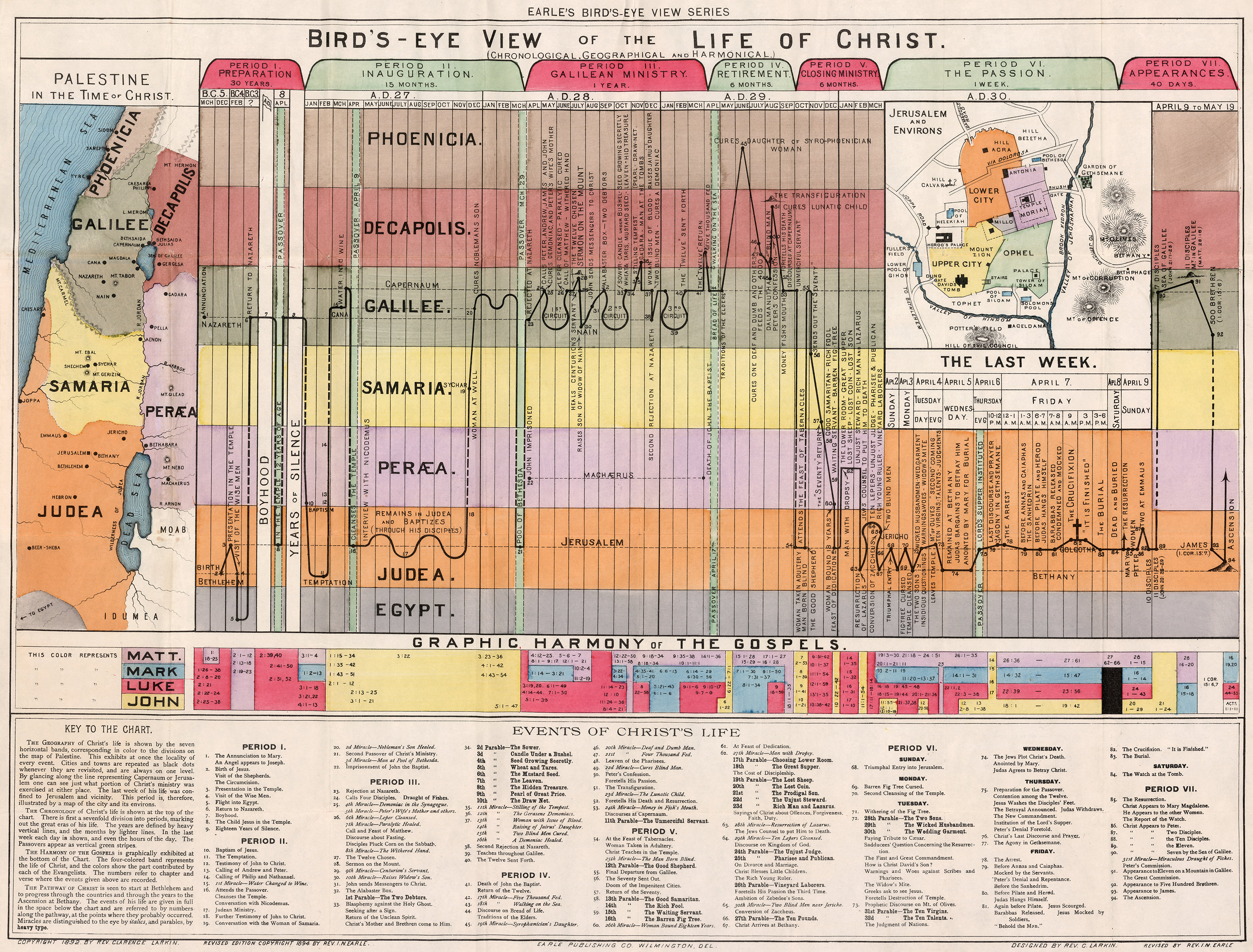
Chart by Clarence Larkin showing a timeline of the life of Jesus Christ as described in the Gospels

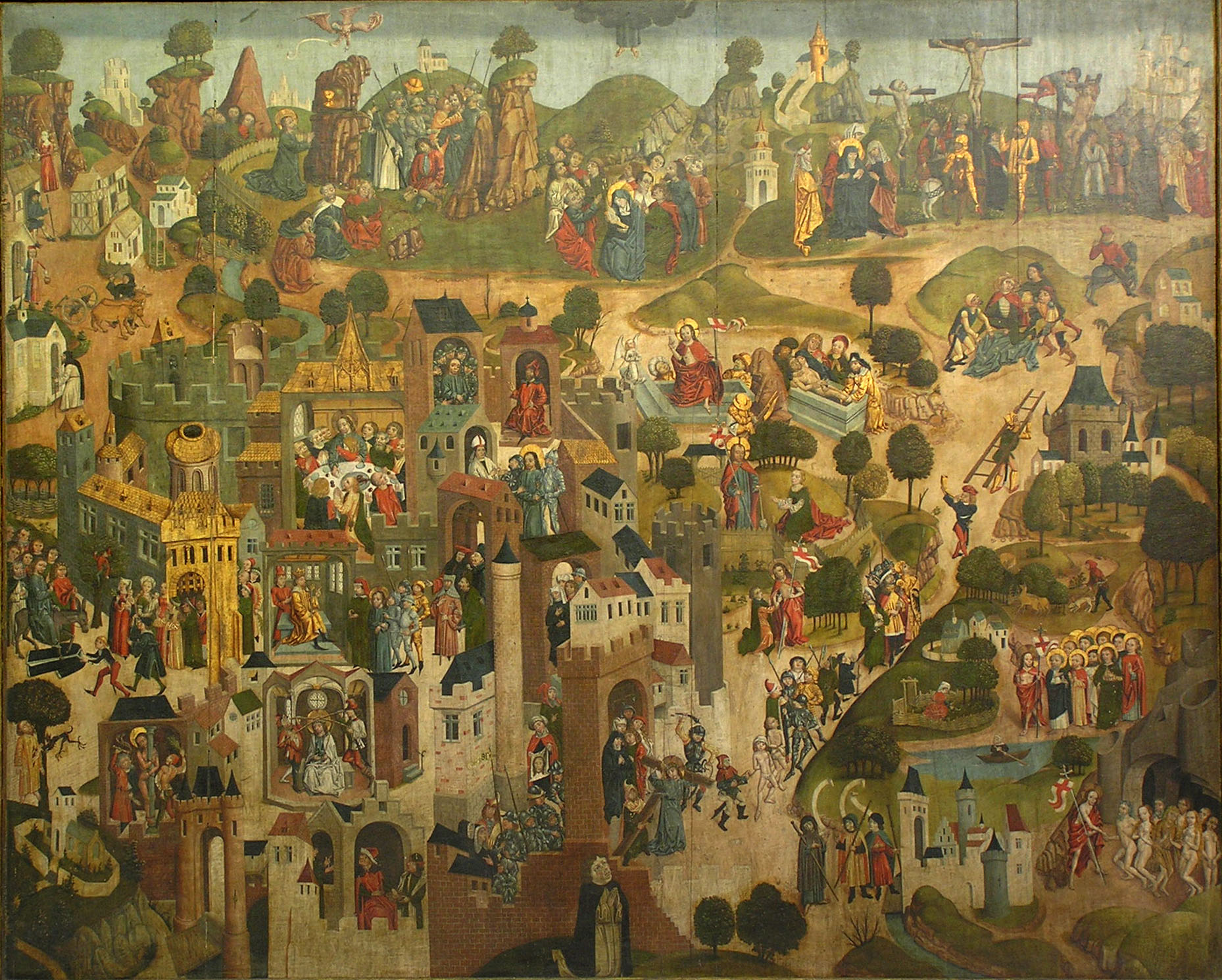
The Passion of Jesus shown in a number of small scenes, c. 1490, from the Entry into Jerusalem through the Golden Gate (lower left) to the Ascension (centre top)

A chronology of Jesus aims to establish a timeline for the events of the life of Jesus. Scholars have correlated Jewish and Greco-Roman documents and astronomical calendars with the New Testament accounts to estimate dates for the major events in Jesus's life.

Two main approaches have been used to estimate the year of the birth of Jesus: one based on the accounts in the Gospels of his birth with reference to King Herod's reign, and the other by subtracting his stated age of "about 30 years" when he began preaching. Most scholars, on this basis, assume a date of birth between 6 and 4 BC.

Three details have been used to estimate the year when Jesus began preaching: a mention of his age of "about 30 years" during "the fifteenth year" of the reign of Tiberius Caesar, another relating to the date of the building of the Temple in Jerusalem, and yet another concerning the death of John the Baptist. Hence, scholars estimate that Jesus began preaching and gathering followers around AD 28–29. According to the three synoptic gospels Jesus continued preaching for at least one year, and according to John the Evangelist for three years.

Five methods have been used to estimate the date of the crucifixion of Jesus. One uses non-Christian sources such as Josephus and Tacitus. Another works backwards from the historically well-established trial of the Apostle Paul by the Roman proconsul Gallio in Corinth in AD 51/52 to estimate the date of Paul's conversion. Both methods result in AD 36 as an upper bound to the crucifixion. Thus, scholars generally agree that Jesus was crucified between AD 30 and AD 36. Isaac Newton's astronomical method calculates those ancient Passovers (always defined by a full moon) which are preceded by a Friday, as specified by all four Gospels; this leaves two potential crucifixion dates, 7 April AD 30 and 3 April AD 33. In the lunar eclipse method, the Apostle Peter's statement that the moon turned to blood at the crucifixion (Acts of the Apostles 2:14–21) is taken to refer to the lunar eclipse of 3 April AD 33; although astronomers are discussing whether the eclipse was visible as far west as Jerusalem. Recent astronomical research uses the supposed contrast between the synoptic date of Jesus' last Passover on the one hand with John's date of the subsequent "Jewish Passover" on the other hand, to propose Jesus' Last Supper to have been on Wednesday, 1 April AD 33 and the crucifixion on Friday, 3 April AD 33.

== Context and overview ==
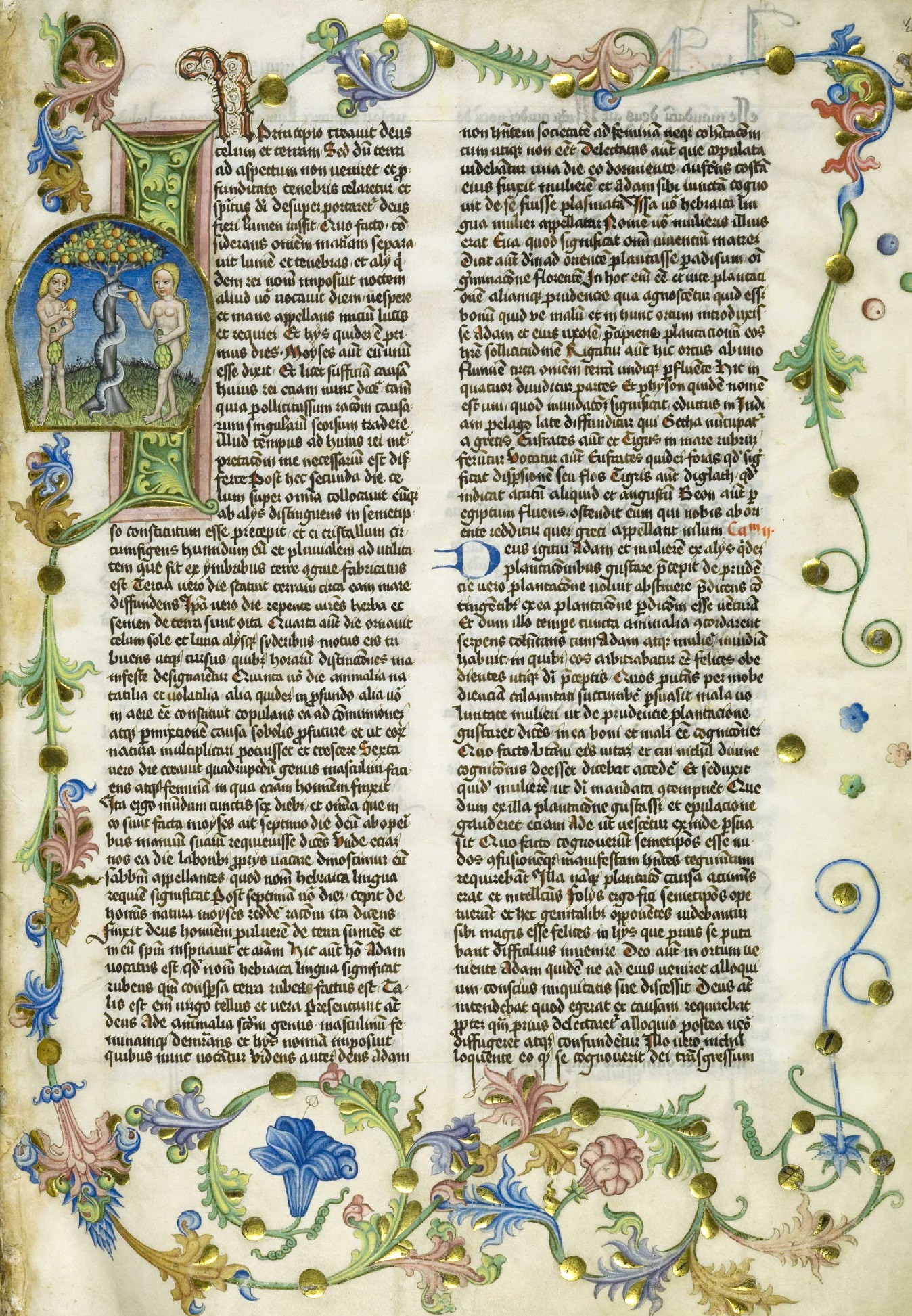
Antiquities of the Jews by Josephus, c. AD 93–94, a source for the chronology of Jesus

The Christian gospels do not claim to provide an exhaustive list of the events in the life of Jesus. They were written as theological documents in the context of early Christianity rather than historical chronicles, and their authors showed little interest in an absolute chronology of Jesus or in synchronizing the episodes of his life with the secular history of the age. One indication that the gospels are theological documents rather than historical chronicles is that they devote about one-third of their text to just seven days, namely the last week of the life of Jesus in Jerusalem, also known as the Passion of Christ.

Nevertheless, the gospels provide some details regarding events which can be clearly dated, so one can establish date ranges regarding major events in Jesus' life by comparison with independent sources. A number of historical non-Christian documents, such as Jewish and Greco-Roman sources, have been used in historical analyses of the chronology of Jesus. Virtually all modern historians agree that Jesus existed, and regard his baptism and his crucifixion as historical events, and assume that approximate ranges for these events can be estimated.

Using these methods, most scholars assume a date of birth between 6 and 4 BC, and that Jesus' preaching began around AD 27–29 and lasted one to three years. They calculate the death of Jesus as having taken place between AD 30 and 36.

== Year of Jesus' birth ==
The date of birth of Jesus of Nazareth is not stated in the gospels or in any secular text, but most scholars assume a date of birth between 6 BC and 4 BC. Two main methods have been used to estimate the year of the birth of Jesus: one based on the accounts of his birth in the gospels with reference to King Herod's reign, and another based on subtracting his stated age of "about 30 years" from the time when he began preaching (Luke 3:23) in "the fifteenth year of the reign of Tiberius Caesar" (Luke 3:1-2): the two methods indicate a date of birth before Herod's death in 4 BC, and a date of birth around 2 BC, respectively.

=== Biblical references to King Herod's reign ===
The two nativity accounts of Jesus in the Gospel of Matthew and Gospel of Luke differ substantially from each other, and are considered to have been written independently. However, some consistent elements are evidently derived from a common early tradition:

- Jesus was born under the Judean king Herod the Great (Matthew 2:1f; Luke 1:5 vs Luke 2:1f)
- in Bethlehem (Matthew 2:5f; Luke 2:4.15)
- prior to his parents moving to Nazareth (Matthew 2:22f), or before their return to Nazareth (Luke 2,39).
- Jesus' parents Mary and Joseph were betrothed (Matthew 1:18–20; Luke 1:27; 2:5).
- His birth was a virgin birth conceived by the Holy Spirit.
- Angels announced Jesus' birth, his name, his role as the Messiah (being a descendant of King David and the son of God), and his mission to save his people from sin (Matthew 1:21; Luke 1:77; 2:11,30).

Thus both Luke and Matthew independently associate Jesus' birth with the reign of Herod the Great. Matthew furthermore implies that Jesus was up to two years old when Herod reportedly ordered the Massacre of the Innocents, that is, the murder of all boys in Bethlehem up to the age of two (Matthew 2:16).

Most scholarship concerning the date of Herod's death follows Emil Schürer's calculations published in 1896, which revised a traditional death date of 1 BC to 4 BC. Two of Herod's sons, Archelaus and Philip the Tetrarch, dated their rule from 4 BC, though Archelaus apparently held royal authority during Herod's lifetime. Philip's reign would last for 37 years, until his death in the traditionally accepted 20th year of Tiberius (AD 34), which implies his accession as 4 BC. The oldest manuscripts of Josephus’s Antiquities has the death of Philip in the 22nd year not the 20th, of Tiberius. This evidence removes the main obstacle for a later date of 1BC for the death of Herod. A list of the oldest manuscripts is found in "Josephus Re-examined", D. Beyer. Some scholars support the traditional date of 1 BC for Herod's death. Filmer and Steinmann, for example, propose that Herod died in 1 BC, and that his heirs backdated their reigns to 4 or 3 BC to assert an overlapping with Herod's rule, and bolster their own legitimacy. In Josephus' account, Herod's death was preceded by a lunar eclipse and followed by Passover. An eclipse took place in 4 BC on 13 March, about 29 days before Passover, and this eclipse has been suggested as the one referred to by Josephus. There were however other eclipses during this period, and there are proponents of 5 BC and the two eclipses of 1 BC occurring 10 January and 29 December. Nevertheless, most scholars favour a birth year for Jesus between 6 and 4 BC.

=== Subtracting Jesus' age of "about 30 years" when preaching ===
Another approach to estimating Jesus' year of birth is based on the statement in Luke 3:23 that he was "about 30 years of age" when starting his ministry. Jesus began to preach after being baptised by John the Baptist, and based on Luke’s gospel John only began baptising people in "the fifteenth year of the reign of Tiberius Caesar" (Luke 3:1–2), which scholars estimate to have been in AD 28–29. Subtracting 30 years, it appears that Jesus was born in 1–2 BC. However, if the phrase "about 30" is interpreted to mean 32 years old, this could fit a date of birth just within the reign of Herod, who died in 4 BC.

The benchmark date of AD 28–29 is independently confirmed by John's statement (John 2:20) that the Temple reportedly was in its 46th year of construction during Passover when Jesus began his ministry, which likewise corresponds to AD 28–29 according to scholarly estimates.

=== Other approaches ===
The Gospel of John 8:57 mentions in passing an upper limit of 50 for Jesus' age when preaching: "The Jews therefore said unto him, Thou art not yet fifty years old, and hast thou seen Abraham?" Fifty years is a round number which emphasises the discrepancy to Jesus's claim he had existed before Abraham, that is, for more than a thousand years.

Some commentators have attempted to establish the date of birth by identifying the Star of Bethlehem with some known astronomical or astrological phenomenon. For example, astronomer Michael Molnar proposed 17 April 6 BC as the likely date of the Nativity, since that date corresponded to the heliacal rising and lunar occultation of Jupiter, while it was momentarily stationary in the constellation of Aries. According to Molnar, to knowledgeable astrologers of this time, this highly unusual combination of events would have indicated that a regal personage would be (or had been) born in Judea. Other research points to a 1991 report from the Royal Astronomical Society, which mentions that Chinese astronomers noted a "comet" that lasted 70 days in the Capricorn region of the sky, in March of 5 BC. Authors Dugard and O'Reilly consider this event as the likely Star of Bethlehem. However, there are many possible phenomena and none seems to match the Gospel account exactly.

== Years of preaching ==
=== Reign of Tiberius and the Gospel of Luke ===
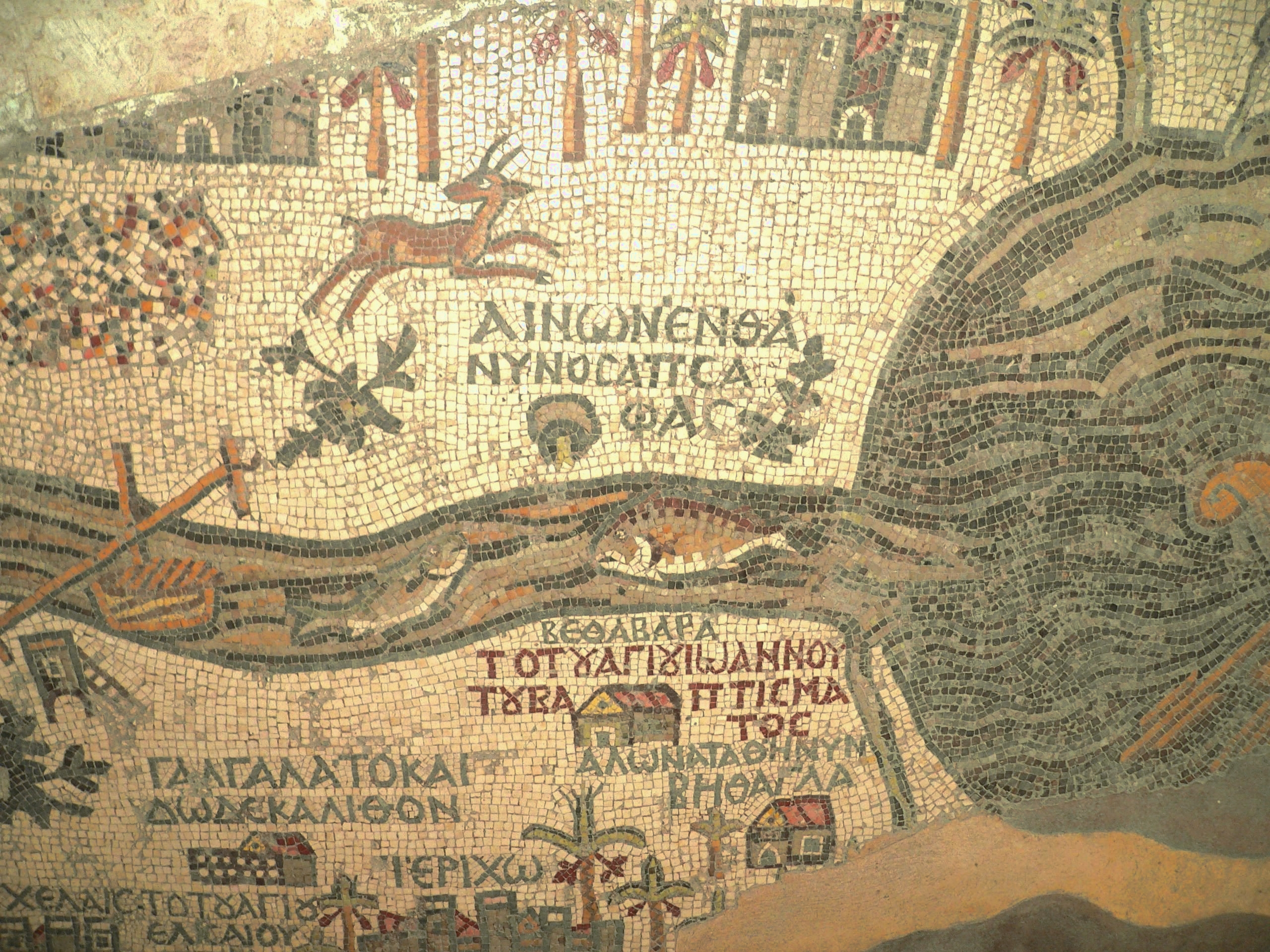
Part of the Madaba Map showing Bethabara (Βέθαβαρά), calling it the place where John baptised

One method for the estimation of the date of the beginning of the ministry of Jesus is based on the Gospel of Luke's specific statement in Luke 3:1–2 about the ministry of John the Baptist which preceded that of Jesus:

Now in the fifteenth year of the reign of Tiberius Caesar, Pontius Pilate being governor of Judaea, and Herod being tetrarch of Galilee, and his brother Philip tetrarch of the region of Ituraea and Trachonitis, and Lysanias tetrarch of Abilene, in the highpriesthood of Annas and Caiaphas, the word of God came unto John the son of Zacharias in the wilderness.

The reign of Tiberius began on the death of his predecessor Augustus in September AD 14, implying that the ministry of John the Baptist began in late AD 28 or early AD 29. Riesner's alternative suggestion is that John the Baptist began his ministry in AD 26 or 27, because Tiberius ruled together with Augustus for two years before becoming the sole ruler. If so, the fifteenth year of Tiberius' reign would be counted from AD 12. Riesner's suggestion is however considered less likely, as all the major Roman historians who calculate the years of Tiberius' rule – namely Tacitus, Suetonius and Cassius Dio – count from AD 14 – the year of Augustus' death. In addition, coin evidence shows that Tiberius started to reign in AD 14.

The New Testament presents John the Baptist as the precursor to Jesus and the Baptism of Jesus as marking the beginning of Jesus' ministry. In his sermon in Acts 10:37–38, delivered in the house of Cornelius the centurion, Apostle Peter refers to what had happened "throughout all Judaea, beginning from Galilee, after the baptism which John preached" and that Jesus had then gone about "doing good". Jesus' baptism account is followed directly by his 40 day fast and ordeal.

=== The Temple in Jerusalem and the Gospel of John ===
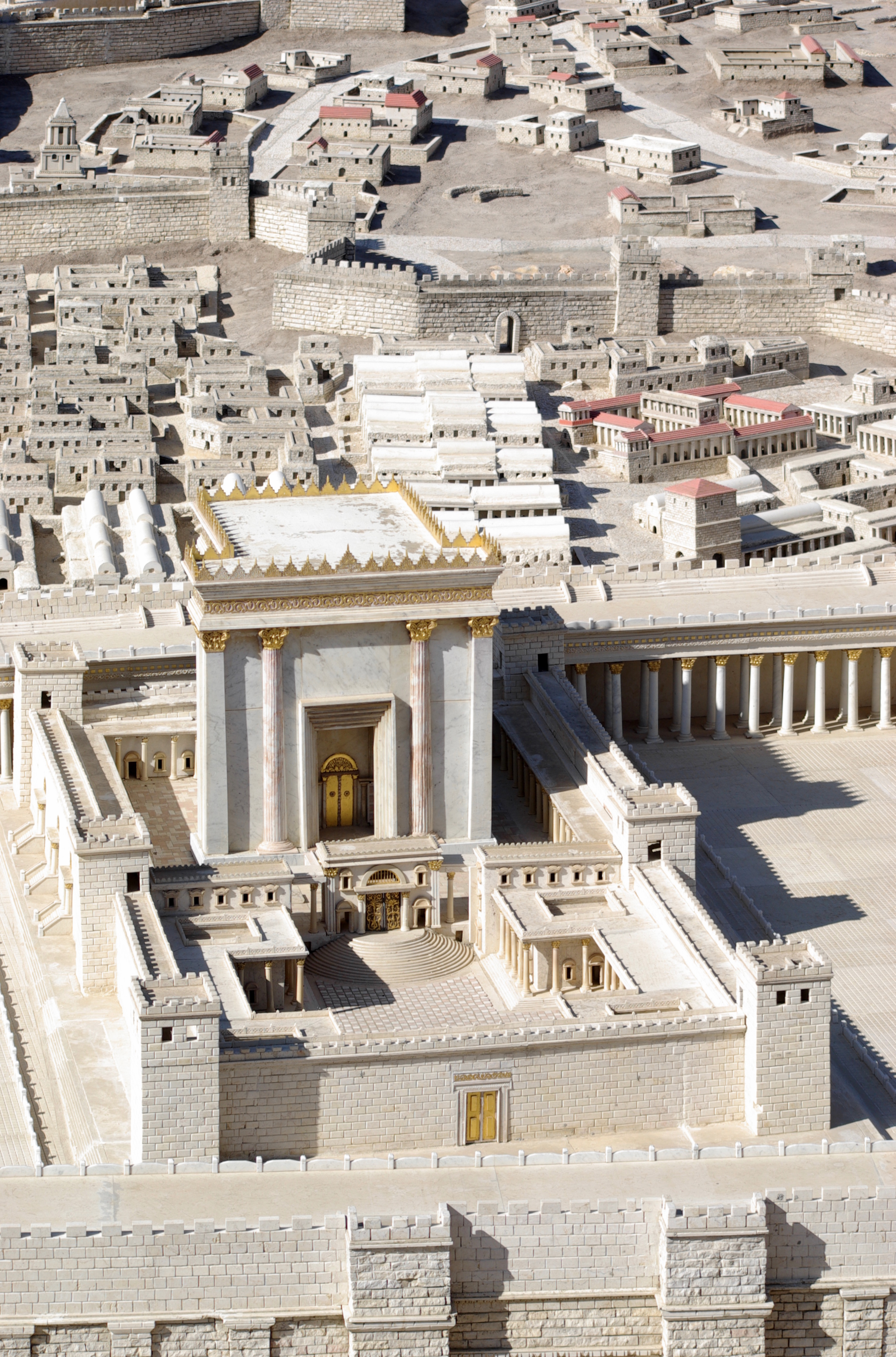
Herod's Temple, referred to in John 2:13, as imagined in the Holyland Model of Jerusalem. It is currently situated adjacent to the Shrine of the Book exhibit at the Israel Museum, Jerusalem.

Another method for estimating the start of the ministry of Jesus without reliance on the Synoptic gospels is to relate the account in the Gospel of John about the visit of Jesus to Herod's Temple in Jerusalem with historical data about the construction of the Temple.

John 2:13 says that Jesus went to the Temple in Jerusalem around the start of his ministry and in John 2:20 Jesus is told: "This temple has been under construction for forty-six years, and will you raise it up in three days?".

Herod's Temple in Jerusalem was an extensive and long term construction on the Temple Mount, which was never fully completed even by the time it was destroyed by the Romans in AD 70. Having built entire cities such as Caesarea Maritima, Herod saw the construction of the Temple as a key, colossal monument. The dedication of the initial temple (sometimes called the inner Temple) followed a 17 or 18 month construction period, just after the visit of Augustus to Syria.

Josephus (Ant 15.11.1) states that the temple's reconstruction was started by Herod in the 18th year of his reign. But there is some uncertainty about how Josephus referred to and computed dates, which event marked the start of Herod's reign, and whether the initial date should refer to the inner Temple, or the subsequent construction. Hence various scholars arrive at slightly different dates for the exact date of the start of the Temple construction, varying by a few years in their final estimation of the date of the Temple visit. Given that it took 46 years of construction, the best scholarly estimate for when Jesus preached is around the year AD 29.

=== Josephus' reference to John the Baptist ===
Both the gospels and first-century historian Flavius Josephus, in his work Antiquities of the Jews, refer to Herod Antipas killing John the Baptist, and to the marriage of Herod and Herodias, establishing two key connections between Josephus and the biblical episodes. Josephus refers to the imprisonment and execution of John the Baptist by Herod Antipas and that Herodias left her husband to marry Herod Antipas, in defiance of Jewish law.

Josephus and the gospels differ, however, on the details and motives, e.g. whether the execution was a consequence of the marriage of Herod Antipas and Herodias (as indicated in Matthew 14:4, Mark 6:18), or a pre-emptive measure by Herod which possibly took place before the marriage to quell a possible uprising based on the remarks of John, as Josephus suggests in Ant 18.5.2.

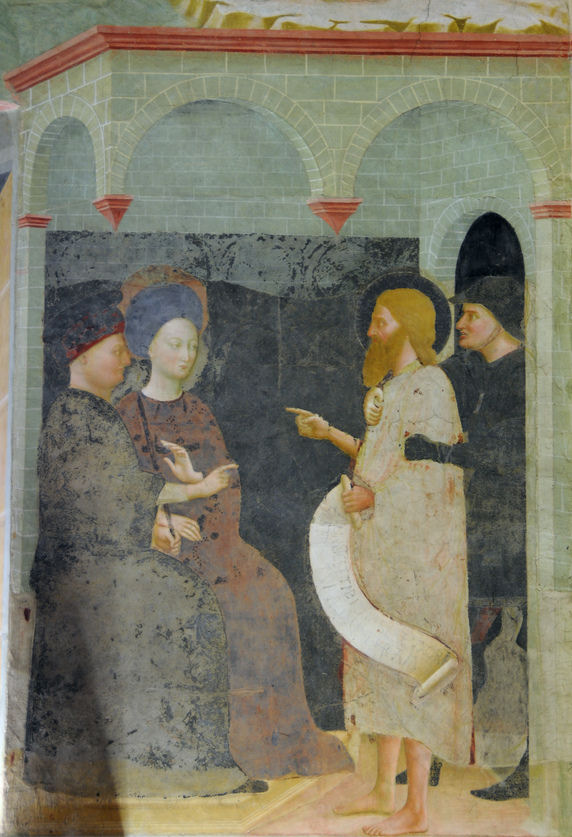
The Baptist scolds Herod. Fresco by Masolino, 1435

The exact year of the marriage of Herod Antipas and Herodias is subject to debate among scholars. While some scholars place the year of the marriage in the range AD 27–31, others have approximated a date as late as AD 35, although such a late date has much less support. In his analysis of Herod's life, Harold Hoehner estimates that John the Baptist's imprisonment probably occurred around AD 30–31. The International Standard Bible Encyclopedia estimates the death of the Baptist to have occurred about AD 31–32.

Josephus stated (Ant 18.5.2) that the AD 36 defeat of Herod Antipas in the conflicts with Aretas IV of Nabatea was widely considered by the Jews of the time as misfortune brought about by Herod's unjust execution of John the Baptist. Given that John the Baptist was executed before the defeat of Herod by Aretas, and based on the scholarly estimates for the approximate date of the marriage of Herod Antipas and Herodias, the last part of the ministry of John the Baptist and hence parts of the ministry of Jesus fall within the historical time span of AD 28–35, with the later year 35 having the least support among scholars.

== Date of crucifixion ==
=== Prefecture of Pontius Pilate ===
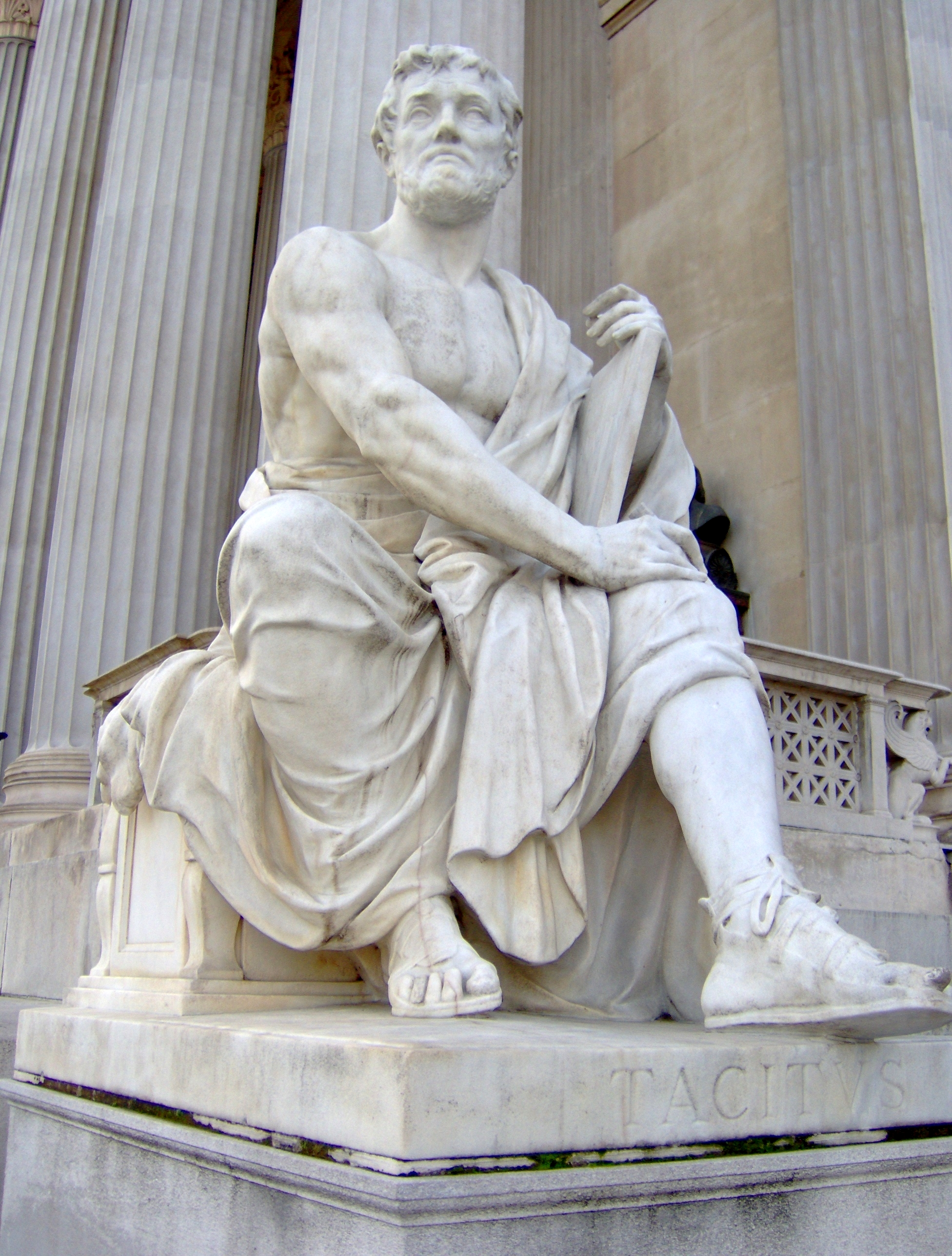
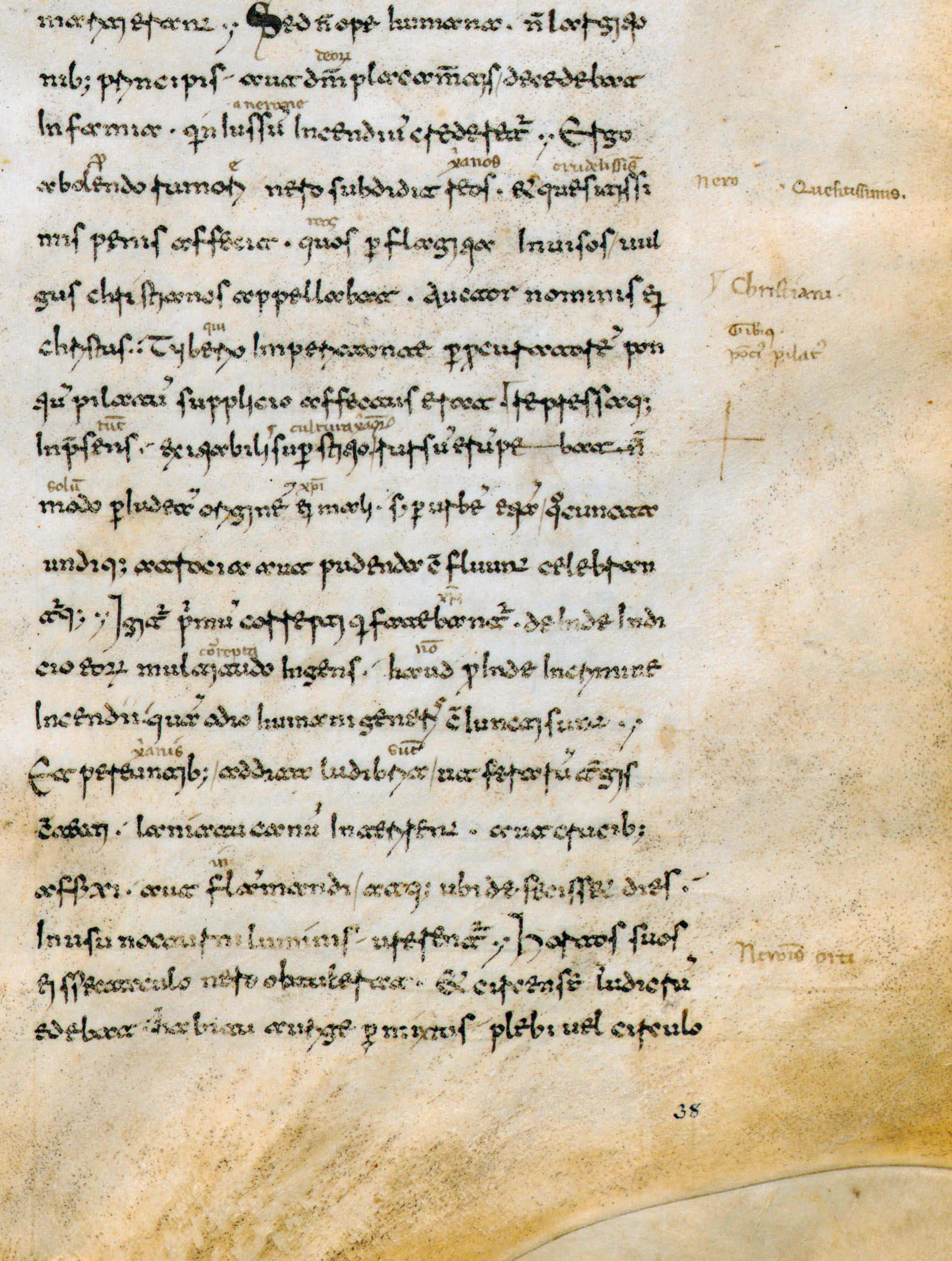
Roman senator and historian Tacitus wrote of the crucifixion of Christ (Jesus) in the Annals, a history of the Roman Empire during the first century.

All four canonical gospels state that Jesus was crucified during the prefecture of Pontius Pilate, the Roman governor of Roman Judaea.

In the Antiquities of the Jews (written about AD 93), Josephus states (Ant 18.3) that Jesus was crucified on the orders of Pilate. Most scholars agree that while this reference includes some later Christian interpolations, it originally included a reference to the execution of Jesus under Pilate.

In the second century the Roman historian Tacitus in The Annals (c. AD 116), described the persecution of Christians by Nero and stated (Annals 15.44) that Jesus had been executed on the orders of Pilate during the reign of Tiberius (Emperor from 18 September AD 14–16 March AD 37).

According to Flavius Josephus, Pontius Pilate was governor of Judea from AD 26 until he was replaced by Marcellus, either in AD 36 or in AD 37, establishing the date of the death of Jesus between AD 26 and AD 37.

=== Reign of Herod Antipas ===
In the Gospel of Luke, while Jesus is in Pilate's court, Pilate realizes that Jesus is a Galilean and thus is under the jurisdiction of Herod Antipas. Given that Herod was in Jerusalem at that time, Pilate decided to send Jesus to Herod to be tried.

This episode is described only in the Gospel of Luke (23:7–15). While some scholars have questioned the authenticity of this episode, given that it is unique to the Gospel of Luke, the International Standard Bible Encyclopedia states that it fits well with the theme of the gospel.

Herod Antipas, a son of Herod the Great, was born before 20 BC and was exiled to Gaul in the summer of AD 39 following a lengthy intrigue involving Caligula and Agrippa I, the grandson of his father. This episode indicates that Jesus' death took place before AD 39.

=== Conversion of Paul ===
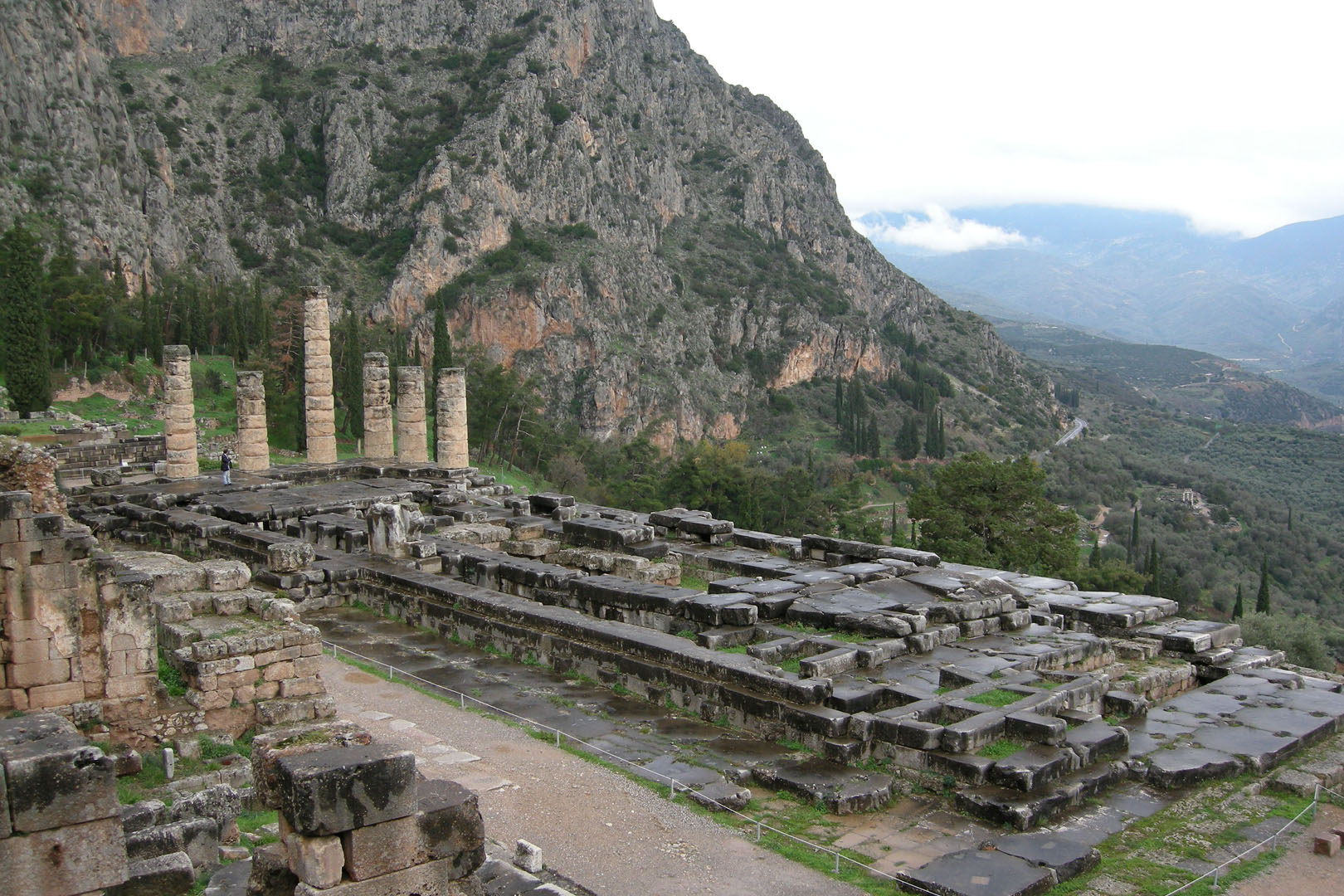
The Temple of Apollo in Delphi, Greece, where the Delphi Inscription was discovered early in the 20th century

Another approach to estimating an upper bound for the year of death of Jesus is the estimation of the date of conversion of Paul the Apostle which the New Testament accounts place some time after the death of Jesus. Paul's conversion is discussed in both the Letters of Paul and in the Acts of the Apostles.

In the First Epistle to the Corinthians (15:3–8), Paul refers to his conversion. The Acts of the Apostles includes three separate references to his conversion experience, in Acts 9, Acts 22 and Acts 26.

Estimating the year of Paul's conversion relies on working backwards from his trial before Junius Gallio in Achaea, Greece (Acts 18:12–17) around AD 51–52, a date derived from the discovery and publication, in 1905, of four stone fragments as part of the Delphi Inscriptions, at Delphi across the Gulf from Corinth. The inscription preserves a letter from Claudius concerning Gallio dated during the 26th acclamation of Claudius, sometime between January 51 and August 52.

On this basis, most historians estimate that Gallio (brother of Seneca the Younger) became proconsul between the spring of AD 51 and the summer of AD 52, and that his position ended no later than AD 53. The trial of Paul is generally assumed to be in the earlier part of Gallio's tenure, based on the reference (Acts 18:2) to his meeting in Corinth with Priscilla and Aquila, who had been recently expelled from Rome based on Emperor Claudius' expulsion of Jews from Rome, which is dated to AD 49–50.

According to the New Testament, Paul spent eighteen months in Corinth, approximately seventeen years after his conversion. Galatians 2:1–10 states that Paul went back to Jerusalem fourteen years after his conversion, and various missions (at times with Barnabas) such as those in Acts 11:25–26 and 2 Corinthians 11:23–33 appear in the Book of Acts. The generally accepted scholarly estimate for the date of conversion of Paul is AD 33–36, placing the death of Jesus before this date range.

=== Astronomical analysis ===
==== Newton's method ====
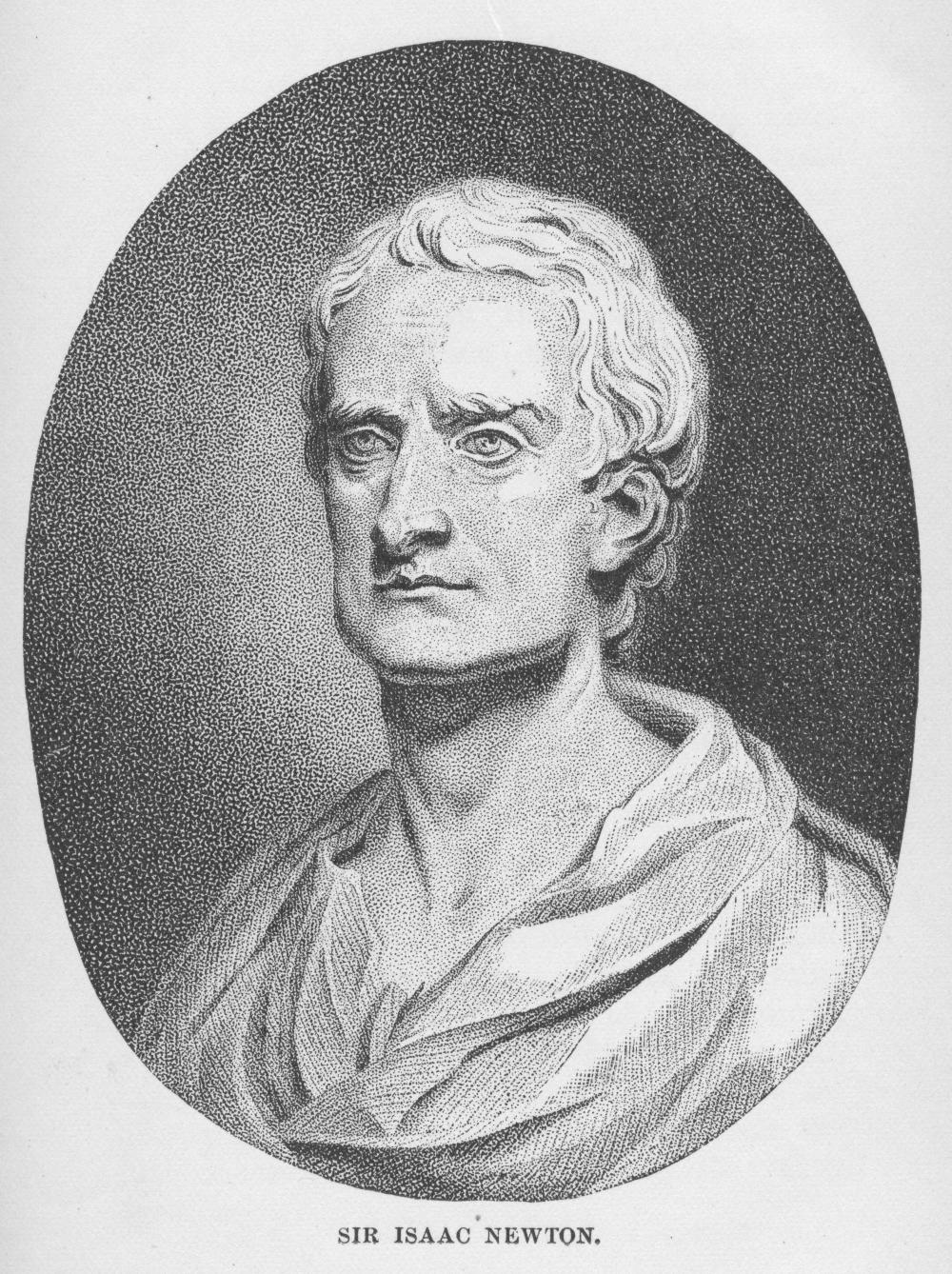
Isaac Newton deduced a methodology to date the crucifixion.

All four Gospels agree to within about a day that the crucifixion was at the time of Passover, and all four Gospels agree that Jesus died a few hours before the commencement of the Jewish Sabbath, i.e. he died before nightfall on a Friday (Matt 27:62; 28:1; Mark 15:42; Luke 23:54; John 19:31, 42). In the official festival calendar of Judaea, as used by the priests of the temple, Passover time was specified precisely. The slaughtering of the lambs for Passover occurred between 3pm and 5pm on the 14th day of the Jewish month Nisan (corresponding to March/April). The Passover meal commenced at moonrise (necessarily a full moon) that evening, i.e., at the start of 15 Nisan (the Jewish day running from evening to evening) (Leviticus 23:5; Numbers 28:16). There is an apparent discrepancy of one day in the Gospel accounts of the crucifixion which has been the subject of considerable debate. In John's Gospel, it is stated that the day of Jesus' trial and execution was the day before Passover (John 18:28 and 19:14), Hence John places the crucifixion on 14 Nisan. Likewise the Apostle Paul, in his First Epistle to the Corinthians, implies Jesus died on a 14 Nisan ("sacrificed as a Passover lamb", 1 Cor 5:7), and was resurrected on the Jewish festival of the first fruits, i.e. on a 16 Nisan (1 Cor 15:20). The correct interpretation of the Synoptics is less clear. Thus some scholars believe that all four Gospels place the crucifixion on Friday, 14 Nisan, others believe that according to the Synoptics it occurred on Friday, 15 Nisan. The problem that then has to be solved is that of determining in which of the years of the reign of Pontius Pilate (AD 26–36) the 14th and 15th Nisan fell on a Friday.

In a paper published posthumously in 1733, Isaac Newton considered only the range AD 31–36 and calculated that the Friday requirement is met only on 3 April AD 33 and 23 April AD 34. The latter date can only have fallen on a Friday if an exceptional leap month had been introduced that year, but this was favoured by Newton. In the twentieth century, the standard view became that of J. K. Fotheringham, who in 1910 suggested 3 April AD 33 on the basis of its coincidence with a lunar eclipse. In 1933, António Cabreira, following a similar method, arrived at the same date, as did, in the 1990s, Bradley E. Schaefer and J. P. Pratt. Additionally, according to physicist Colin Humphreys and astronomer W. Graeme Waddington, the lunar Jewish calendar leaves only two plausible dates within the reign of Pontius Pilate for Jesus' death, and both of these would have been a 14 Nisan as specified in the Gospel of John: Friday, 7 April AD 30, and Friday, 3 April AD 33.

A more refined calculation takes into account that the Jewish calendar was based not on astronomical calculation but on observation, following criticism that it is possible to establish the phase of the moon on a particular day two thousand years ago but not whether it was obscured by clouds or haze. Including the possibility of a cloudy sky obscuring the moon, and assuming that the Jewish authorities would be aware that lunar months can only be either 29 or 30 days long (the time from one new moon to the next is 29.53 days), then the refined calculation states that the Friday requirement might also have been met, during Pontius Pilate's term of office, on 11 April AD 27. Another potential date arises if the Jewish authorities happened to add an irregular lunar leap month to compensate for a meteorologically delayed harvest season: this would yield one additional possibility during Pilate's time, which is Newton's favoured date of 23 April AD 34. Humphreys calculates but rejects these AD 27 and AD 34 dates on the basis that the former is much too early to be compatible with Luke 3:1–2, and spring AD 34 is probably too late to be compatible with Paul's timeline, confirming Friday, 7 April AD 30, and Friday, 3 April AD 33 as the two feasible crucifixion dates.

==== Eclipse method ====
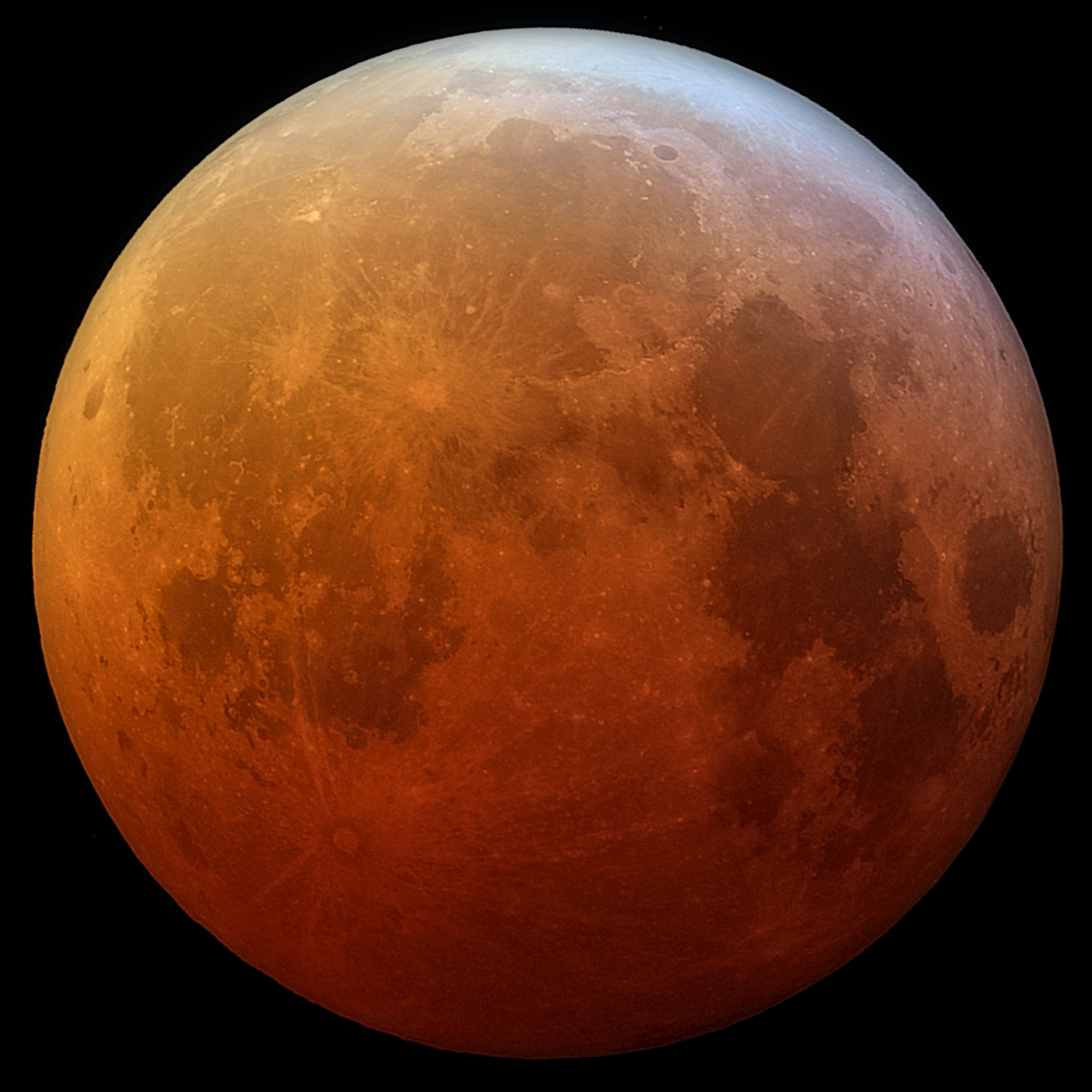
Lunar eclipse, 21 January 2019. Red hue caused by diffraction of sunlight through Earth's atmosphere.

A lunar eclipse is potentially alluded to in Acts of the Apostles 2:14–21 ("The sun shall be turned into darkness, And the moon into blood, Before the day of the Lord come"), as pointed out by Humphreys and Waddington. There was in fact a lunar eclipse on 3 April AD 33, a date which coincides with one of Newton's astronomically possible crucifixion dates (see above). Humphreys and Waddington have calculated that in ancient Jerusalem this eclipse would have been visible at moonrise at 6.20pm as a 20% partial eclipse (a full moon with a potentially red "bite" missing at the top left of the moon's disc). They propose that a large proportion of the Jewish population would have witnessed this eclipse as they would have been waiting for sunset in the west and immediately afterwards the rise of the anticipated full moon in the east as the prescribed signal to start their household Passover meals. Humphreys and Waddington therefore suggest a scenario where Jesus was crucified and died at 3pm on 3 April AD 33, followed by a red partial lunar eclipse at moonrise at 6.20pm observed by the Jewish population, and that Peter recalls this event when preaching the resurrection to the Jews (Acts of the Apostles 2:14–21). Astronomer Bradley Schaefer agrees with the eclipse date but disputes that the eclipsed moon would have been visible by the time the moon had risen in Jerusalem.

A potentially related issue involves the reference in the Synoptic Gospels to a three-hour period of darkness over the whole land on the day of the crucifixion (according to Luke 23:45 τοῦ ἡλίου ἐκλιπόντος – the sun was darkened). Although some scholars view this as a literary device common among ancient writers rather than a description of an actual event, other writers have attempted to identify a meteorological event or a datable astronomical phenomenon which this could have referred to. It could not have been a solar eclipse, since this could not take place during the full moon at Passover, and in any case solar eclipses take minutes, not hours. In 1983, Humphreys and Waddington noted that the reference to a solar eclipse is missing in some versions of Luke and argued that the solar eclipse was a later faulty scribal amendment of what was actually the lunar eclipse of AD 33. This is a claim which historian David Henige describes as "undefended" and "indefensible". Humphreys and a number of scholars have alternatively argued for the sun's darkening to have been caused by a khamsin, i.e. a sand storm, which can occur between mid-March and May in the Middle East and which does typically last for several hours.

In a review of Humphreys' book, theologian William R. Telford points out that the non-astronomical parts of his lunar eclipse argument are based on the assumption that the chronologies described in the New Testament are historical and based on eyewitness testimony, accepting uncritically statements such as the "three different Passovers in John" and Matthew's statement that Jesus died at the ninth hour. He also alleges that Humphreys uses two very dubious sources, namely Pilate's alleged letter to Tiberius and the writings of the fifth-century Bishop Cyril of Alexandria, which Humphreys however classifies as forgery or contemporary interpretation indicative of a tradition at the time.

==== Double Passover method ====
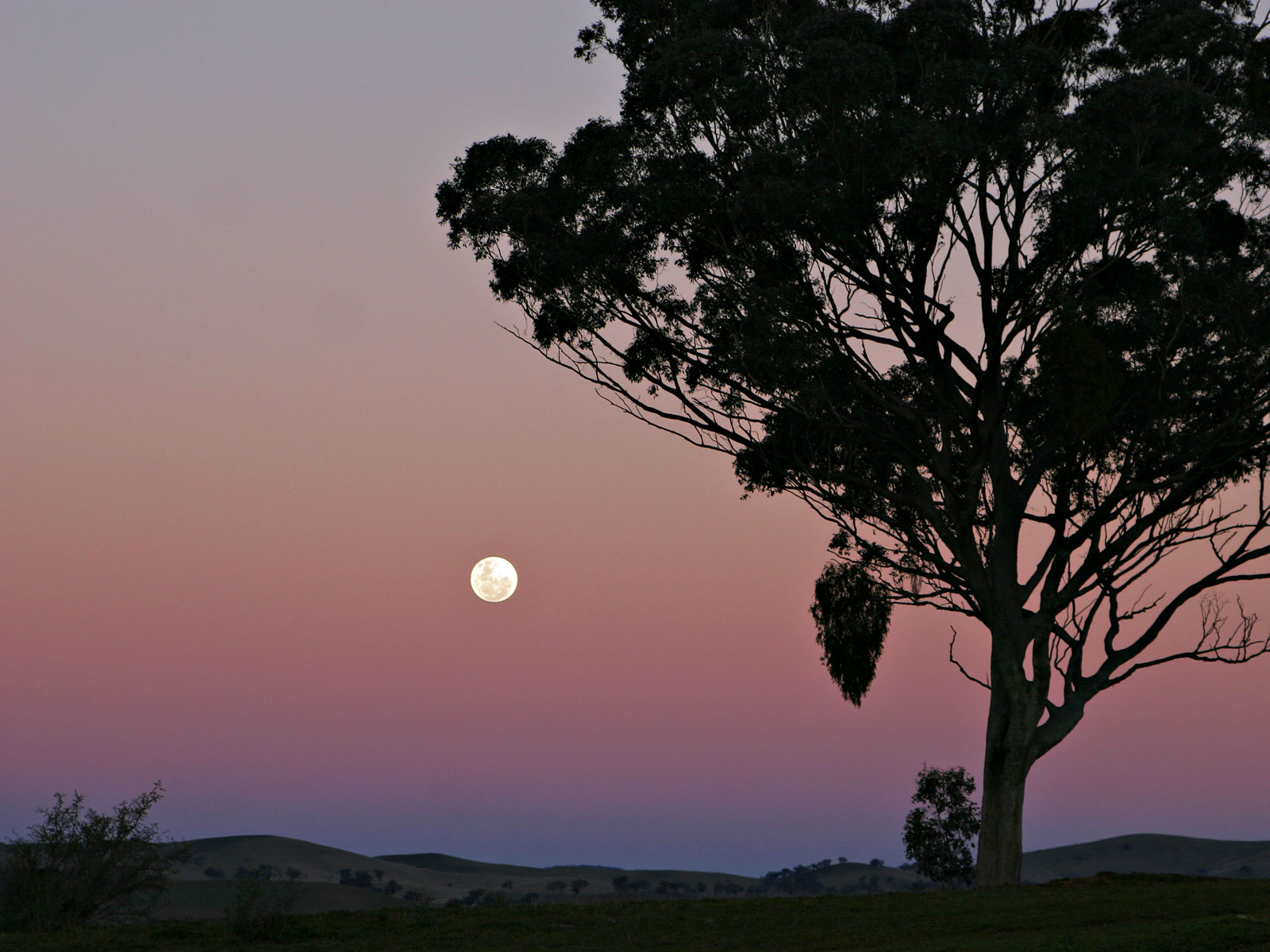
The rising full moon at sunset signals the start of the Passover meal. This is two weeks after the new moon has heralded the start of the month of Nisan (March/April).

In the crucifixion narrative, the synoptic gospels stress that Jesus celebrated a Passover meal (Mark 14:12ff, Luke 22:15) before his crucifixion, which contrasts sharply with the independent gospel of John who is explicit that the official "Jewish" Passover (John 11:55) started at nightfall after Jesus' death. In his 2011 book, Colin Humphreys proposes a resolution to this apparent discrepancy by positing that Jesus' "synoptic" Passover meal in fact took place two days before John's "Jewish" Passover because the former is calculated by the putative original Jewish lunar calendar (itself based on the Egyptian liturgical lunar calendar putatively introduced to the Israelites by Moses in the 13th century BC, and still used today by the Samaritans). The official "Jewish" Passover in contrast was determined by a Jewish calendar reckoning which had been modified during the Babylonian exile in the 6th century BC. This modified Jewish calendar is in use among most Jews today. One basic difference lies in the determination of the first day of the new month: while the Samaritans use the calculated (because by definition invisible) new moon, mainstream Jews use the first observation of the thin crescent of the waxing moon which is on average 30 hours later. The other basic difference lies in the fact that the Samaritan calendar uses a sunrise-to-sunrise day, while the official Jewish calendar uses a sunset-to-sunset day. Due to these differences, the Samaritan Passover is normally one day earlier than the Jewish Passover (and in some years two or more days earlier). The crucifixion year of Jesus can then be calculated by asking the question in which of the two astronomically possible years of AD 30 and AD 33 is there a time gap between the last supper and the crucifixion which is compatible with the gospel timeline of Jesus' last 6 days. The astronomical calculations show that a hypothetical AD 30 date would require an incompatible Monday Last Supper, while AD 33 offers a compatible Last Supper on Wednesday, 1 April AD 33, followed by a compatible crucifixion on Friday, 3 April AD 33.

Given these assumptions he argues that the calculated date of Wednesday, 1 April AD 33 for the Last Supper allows all four gospel accounts to be astronomically correct, with Jesus celebrating Passover two days before his death according to the original Mosaic calendar, and the Jewish authorities celebrating Passover just after the crucifixion, using the modified Babylonian calendar. In contrast, the Christian church tradition of celebrating the Last Supper on Maundy Thursday would be an anachronism. The calculated chronology incidentally supports John's and Paul's narratives that Jesus died at the same hour (Friday 3pm) on 3 April AD 33 that the Passover lambs were slaughtered.

In a review of Humphreys' book, theologian William R. Telford counters that the separate day schema of the Gospel's Holy Week "is an artificial as well as an inconsistent construction". As Telford had pointed out in his own book in 1980, "the initial three-day structure found in [Mark 11] is occasioned by the purely redactional linkage of the extraneous fig-tree story with the triumphal entry and cleansing of the temple traditions, and is not a chronology upon which one can base any historical reconstructions."

=== Scholarly debate on the hour, day, and year of death ===
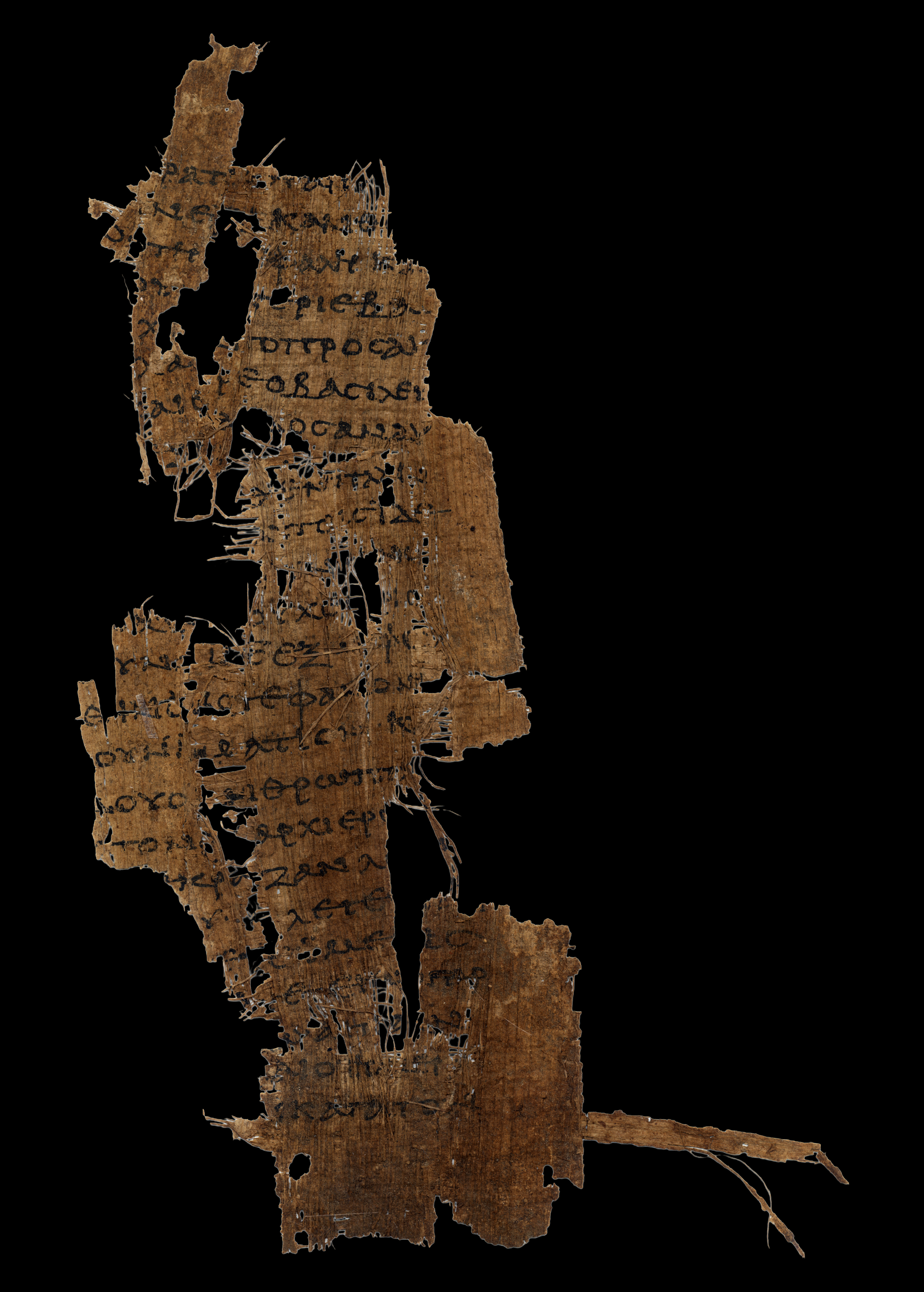
A Papyrus 90 fragment of John 19

The estimation of the hour of the death of Jesus based on the New Testament accounts has been the subject of debate among scholars for centuries. Some scholars have argued that it is unlikely that the many events of the Passion could have taken place in the span from midnight to about 9 o'clock in the morning.

The consensus of modern scholarship agrees with the four Gospels that the New Testament accounts represent a crucifixion occurring on a Friday, although a Wednesday crucifixion has also been proposed.

The debate on the date can be summarised as follows. In the Synoptic account, the Last Supper takes place on the first night of Passover, defined in the Torah as occurring after daylight on 14 of Nisan, and the crucifixion is on 15 Nisan. However, in the Gospel of John the trial of Jesus takes place before the Passover meal and the sentencing takes place on the day of Preparation, before Passover. John's account places the crucifixion on 14 Nisan, since the law mandated the lamb had to be sacrificed between 3:00 pm and 5:00 pm and eaten before midnight on that day. It is problematic to reconcile the chronology presented by John with the Synoptic tradition that the Last Supper was a Passover meal. Some scholars have presented arguments to reconcile the accounts, although Raymond E. Brown, reviewing these, concluded that they can not be easily reconciled. One involves the suggestion that for Jesus and his disciples, the Passover could have begun at dawn Thursday, while for traditional Jews it would not have begun until dusk that same day. Another is that John followed the Roman practice of calculating the new day beginning at midnight, rather than the Jewish reckoning. However, this Roman practice was used only for dating contracts and leases. D. A. Carson argues that 'preparation of the Passover' could mean any day of the Passover week. Some have argued that the modern precision of marking the time of day should not be read back into the gospel accounts, written at a time when no standardization of timepieces, or exact recording of hours and minutes was available. Andreas Köstenberger argues that in the first century time was often estimated to the closest three-hour mark, and that the intention of the author of the Mark Gospel was to provide the setting for the three hours of darkness while the Gospel of John seeks to stress the length of the proceedings, starting in the 'early morning'" William Barclay has argued that the portrayal of the death of Jesus in the John Gospel is a literary construct, presenting the crucifixion as taking place at the time on the day of Passover when the sacrificial lamb would be killed, and thus portraying Jesus as the Lamb of God. This understanding fits with Old Testament typology, in which Jesus entered Jerusalem to identify himself as the Paschal lamb on Nisan 10 was crucified and died at 3:00 in the afternoon of Nisan 14, at the same time the High Priest would have sacrificed the Paschal lamb, and rose before dawn the morning of Nisan 16, as a type of offering of the First Fruits.

Colin Humphreys' widely publicised "double passover" astronomical analysis, published in 2011 and outlined above, places the time of death of Jesus at 3pm on 3 April AD 33 and claims to reconcile the Gospel accounts for the "six days" leading up to the crucifixion. His solution is that the synoptic gospels and John's gospel use two distinct calendars (the official Jewish lunar calendar, and what is today the Samaritan lunar calendar, the latter used in Jesus' day also by the Essenes of Qumran and the Zealots). Humphrey's proposal was preceded in 1957 by the work of Annie Jaubert, who suggested that Jesus held his Last Supper at Passover time according to the Qumran solar calendar. Humphreys rejects Jaubert's conclusion by demonstrating that the Qumran solar reckoning would always place Jesus' Last Supper after the Jewish Passover, in contradiction to all four gospels. Instead, Humphreys points out that the Essene community at Qumran additionally used a lunar calendar, itself evidently based on the Egyptian liturgical lunar calendar. Humphreys suggests that the reason why his two-calendar solution had not been discovered earlier is (a) widespread scholarly ignorance of the existence of the Egyptian liturgical lunar calendar (used alongside the well-known Egyptian administrative solar calendar, and presumably the basis for the 13th-century BC Jewish lunar calendar), and (b) the fact that the modern surviving small community of Samaritans did not reveal the calculations underlying their lunar calendar (preserving the Egyptian reckoning) to outsiders until the 1960s.

In a review of Humphreys' book, theologian William R Telford points out that the non-astronomical parts of his argument are based on the assumption that the chronologies described in the New Testament are historical and based on eyewitness testimony. In doing so, Telford says, Humphreys has built an argument upon unsound premises which "does violence to the nature of the biblical texts, whose mixture of fact and fiction, tradition and redaction, history and myth all make the rigid application of the scientific tool of astronomy to their putative data a misconstrued enterprise."

New 2025 findings on Ancient Greek timekeeping, by Adrian Hundhausen, suggest a more accurate timing might be "just after 2pm" instead of "approximately 3pm". The new findings reinterpret the phrase "περὶ ταύτην τὴν ὥρᾱν" as meaning "at the beginning of an hour zone" instead of "approximately at the hour line", which suggests all Ancient Greek translations to modern languages of all text mentioning time, are actually off by 1 hour.

Approximate chronological comparison between the Jesus Passion narratives according to the Gospels of Mark and John. Each section ('1' to '28') represents three hours of time.

== Resurrection on the third day ==
After the crucifixion, the Gospels report the discovery of Jesus' empty tomb, and subsequently the Gospels and Paul provide accounts of Jesus' resurrection. A potential chronological contradiction arises in the fact that the resurrection is referred to as happening "on the third day" (e.g. Matt 16:21) whereas elsewhere Matthew (Matt 12:40) states that Jesus would be buried "three days and three nights". The modern concept of zero as a number was introduced by Indian scholars only in the fifth century AD, so that for example the Gregorian calendar never had a year "AD 0" and instead begins with the year AD 1 which is immediately preceded by 1 BC. Applied to the reckoning of days, in the absence of a day "zero", that is, using inclusive counting, many modern languages (e.g. Greek, Italian, Spanish, French, Portuguese, Welsh) continue referring to two weeks as "fifteen days", whereas in English, which does observe zero and thus uses exclusive counting, this space of time is referred to as a fortnight. Following general practice at the time, the Gospels employ inclusive counting, highlighted in Mt 27.62–64:

the chief priests and the Pharisees went to Pilate. 'Sir,' they said, 'we remember that while he was still alive that deceiver said, "After three days [Gr. meta treis hemeras] I will rise again." So give the order for the tomb to be made secure until the third day [Gr. tes trites hemeras]'"

where Matthew uses "after three days" and "until the third day" interchangeably.

== Ancient estimates ==
Other estimates of the chronology of Jesus have been proposed over the centuries:

- Tertullian writes that Jesus was born in the 41st year of Augustus, who reigned 56 years (from 43 BC), and died at the age of 30 on 25 March. The figure of "41st" is repeated by Irenaeus and Origen.
- Clement of Alexandria writes that Jesus was born in the 28th year of Augustus, who reigned 43 years (from 30 BC). Both Clement and Tertullian date Jesus' birth to 3 BC or (more likely) 2 BC, which may just be the result of subtracting 30 years to AD 29, when Jesus began his preaching, as he was said to be "around 30 years" of age.
- Hippolytus, states that Jesus was born on Wednesday, 25 December, in the 42nd year of Augustus, 5500 years after Adam; and he died in his 33rd year of life on Friday, 25 March, in the 18th year of Tiberius, on the consulship of Rufus and Rubellius [AD 29]. The 42nd year of Augustus refers to either 3 BC or 2 BC. However, this does not match the "33rd year" figure, which would place Jesus' birth in 4 BC. The year AD 29 was Tiberius' 16th year, not his 18th, although it is sometimes argued that some authors dated his reign from AD 12, when he was made co-regent by Augustus. There is much confusion regarding the reckoning of Tiberius' reign. 25 December was a Wednesday in 3 BC, and 25 March was a Friday in AD 29.
- The Liber Generationis, a work found alongside Hippolytus work, states that Jesus lived 30 years and gives an interval of 206 between the Passion and the "present day", which was the year 5738 after Adam, the 13th of Severus Alexander [AD 234]. This implies a birth date of 3 BC.

Eusebius, in his Historia Ecclesiae first published in AD 313, places the birth of Jesus in the 42nd year of Augustus (who ruled 57 years in total), which is also the 28th year after the death of Antony and Cleopatra; this gives 2 BC. The 3rd/4th century Roman historian Lactantius states that Jesus was crucified on 23 March AD 29, while the 5th century writer Cassiodorus states that Jesus was born in 3 BC and died in AD 31.

=== Anno Domini ===
In AD 525 Dionysius Exiguus devised an Easter table to calculate the dates of Easter at a time when Julian calendar years were still being identified by naming the consuls who held office that year — Dionysius himself stated that the "present year" was "the consulship of Probus Junior", which was 525 years "since the incarnation of our Lord Jesus Christ". Thus Dionysius implied that Jesus' incarnation occurred 525 years earlier. Bonnie J. Blackburn and Leofranc Holford-Strevens briefly present arguments for 2 BC, 1 BC, or AD 1 as the year Dionysius intended for the Nativity or incarnation. Among the sources of confusion are:

- In modern times, incarnation is synonymous with the conception, but some ancient writers, such as Bede, considered incarnation to be synonymous with the Nativity.
- The civil or consular year began on 1 January but the Diocletian year began on 29 August (30 August in the year before a Julian leap year).
- There were inaccuracies in the lists of consuls.
- There were confused summations of emperors' regnal years.

It is not known how Dionysius established the year of Jesus's birth. Two major theories are that Dionysius based his calculation on the Gospel of Luke, which states that Jesus was "about thirty years old" shortly after "the fifteenth year of the reign of Tiberius Caesar", and hence subtracted thirty years from that date, or that Dionysius counted back 532 years from the first year of his new table.

The Anglo-Saxon historian the Venerable Bede, who was familiar with the work of Dionysius, used Anno Domini dating in his Ecclesiastical History of the English People, completed in AD 731. Both Dionysius and Bede regarded Anno Domini as beginning at the incarnation of Jesus, but "the distinction between Incarnation and Nativity was not drawn until the late 9th century, when in some places the Incarnation was identified with Christ's conception, i.e., the Annunciation on March 25". On the continent of Europe, Anno Domini was introduced as the calendrical system of choice of the Carolingian Renaissance by the English cleric and scholar Alcuin in the late eighth century. Its endorsement by Emperor Charlemagne and his successors popularizing this calendar throughout the Carolingian Empire ultimately lies at the core of the calendar's global prevalence today.

== See also ==
- Depiction of Jesus
- Historical Jesus
- Life of Jesus in the New Testament
- Timeline of Christianity
