= The Dream of Saint Joseph (Champaigne) =

1640s painting by Philippe de Champaigne

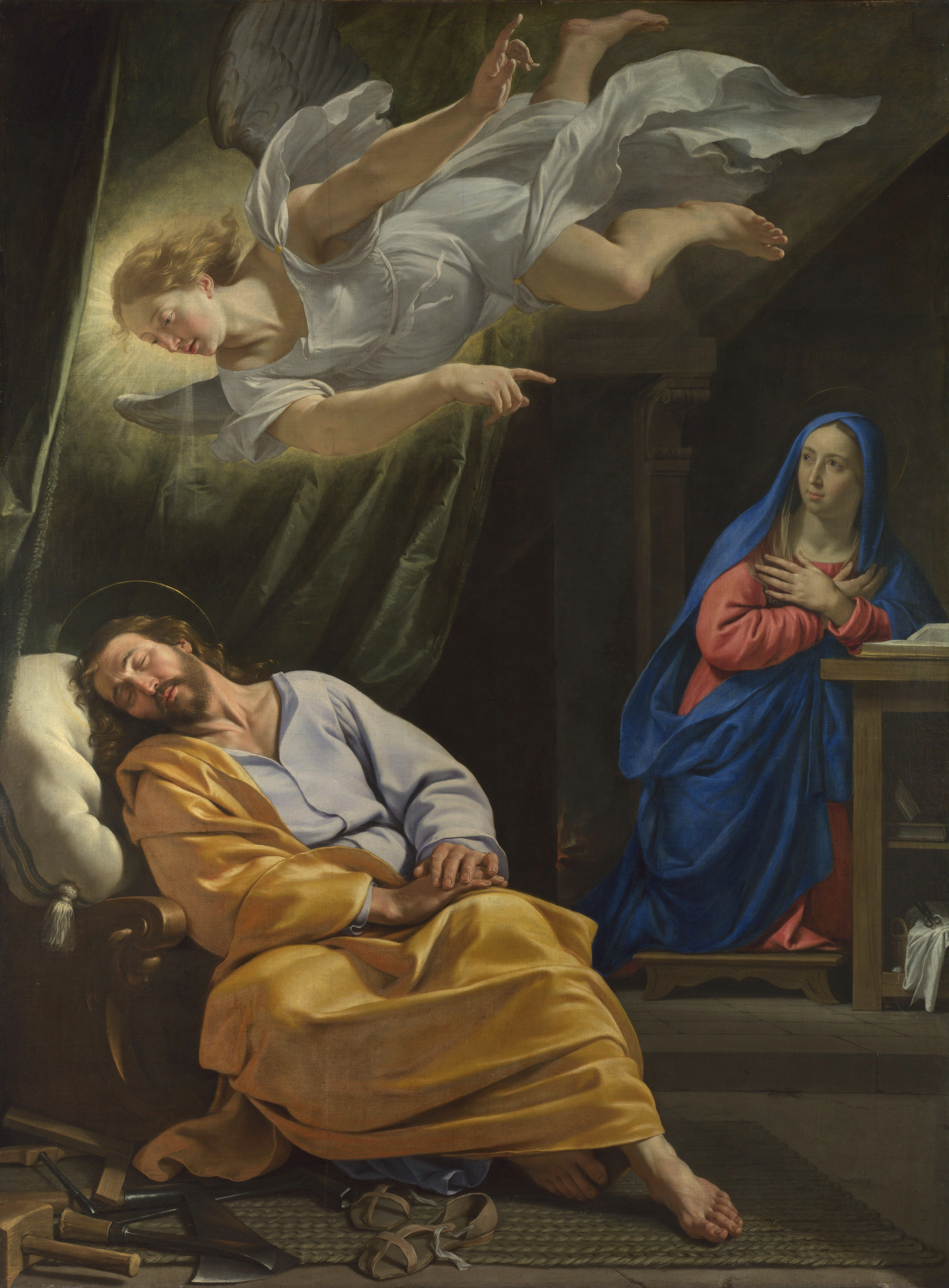
The Dream of Saint Joseph (1642–1643) by Philippe de Champaigne

The Dream of Saint Joseph is an oil painting on canvas by Philippe de Champaigne, now in the National Gallery, London, which bought it in 1958. It measures 209.5 × 155.8 cm, and probably dates to 1642–1643.

It depicts Saint Joseph's dream as set out in the first chapter of the Gospel of Matthew verses 20–21; this is the first of Joseph's four dreams, as recorded in Matthew, a subject also known as the Annunciation to Joseph. An angel appears to him and reassures him that, even though she is pregnant, he should marry the Virgin Mary, who appears on the right:

"Joseph, son of David, don't be afraid to take Mary home as your wife. The baby inside her is from the Holy Spirit. She is going to have a son. You must give him the name Jesus. That's because he will save his people from their sins."

The subject was unusual before the 17th century, when the cult of Saint Joseph became widely promoted within the Catholic Church, by figures including Pope Gregory XV, who in 1621 made Joseph's feast day of 19 March a holy day of obligation, when Catholics were required to attend Mass. Philippe de Champaigne painted the subject three times, for churches and convents.

In late 2025 the painting was on display in Room 29 ("Making Paris a New Rome: French Painting 1600–1700") at the National Gallery.

== Description ==
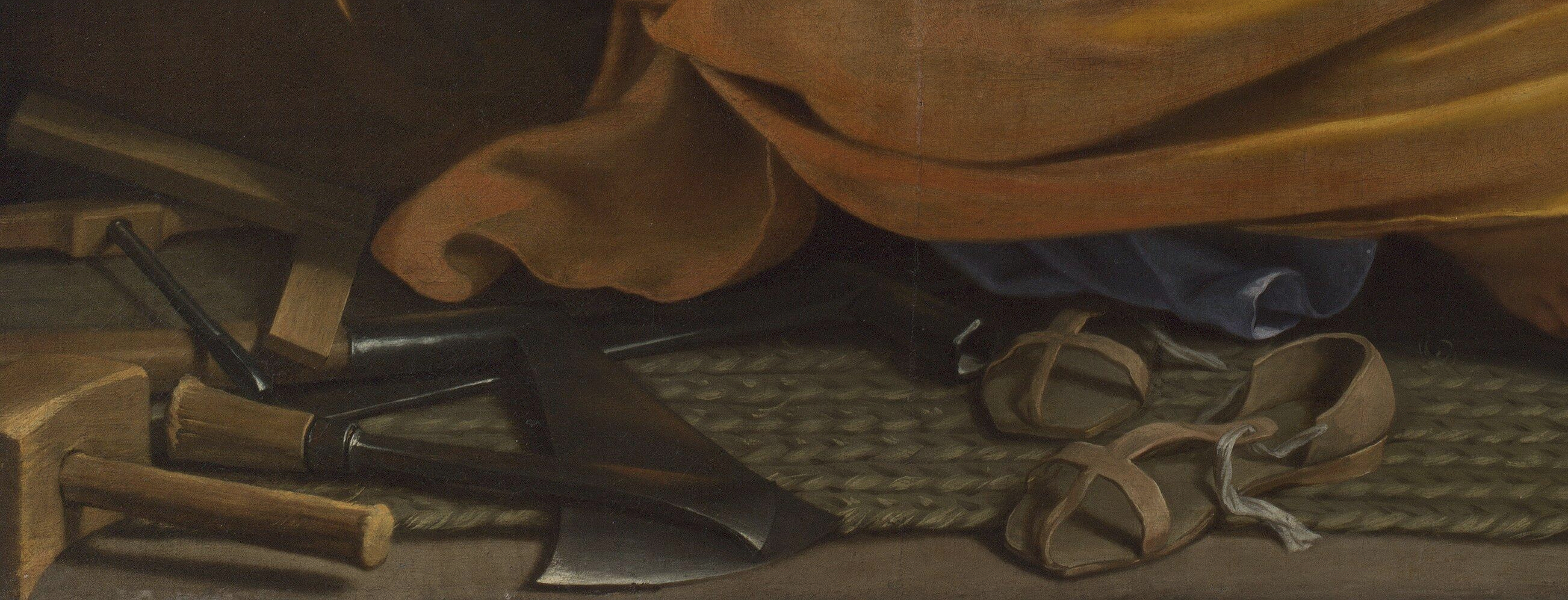
Detail of Joseph's tools and sandals

In accordance with the new treatment of Joseph in the 17th century, he is depicted as "a man of vigorous age", rather than the elderly and sometimes rather feeble figure usually shown in preceding centuries. A collection of the tools of his trade as a carpenter is at bottom left. There is something of a contradiction between the basic woodworking tools and Joseph's clothes, and the rather fancy carving on his chair and the fireplace behind, as well as Joseph's pillow and the green silk drape at the left.

The angel points to heaven with one hand and Mary with another. Attempts have been made to find complex meaning in the position of his fingers, as well as the yellow of Joseph's robe, but Humphrey Wine rejects these.

Pieces of canvas (20.5 × 29.5 cm each) have been added at each top corner, presumably reflecting an original frame with a different shape. Apart from these, the painting is on three pieces of canvas sewn together. It is generally in good condition.

== Provenance ==
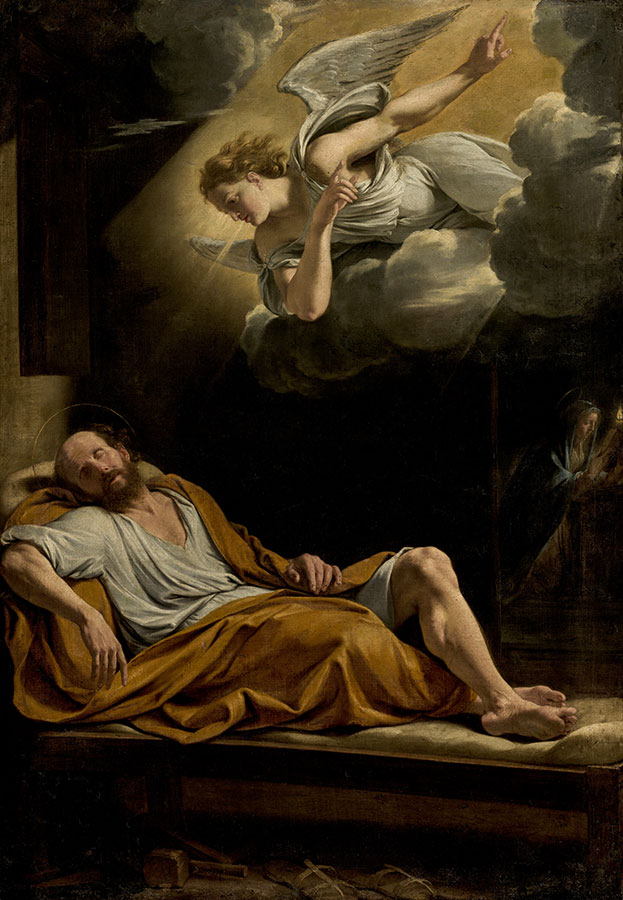
A different painting of the subject by Champaigne, now in the Museo Nacional de Bellas Artes de La Habana, Cuba

The painting was very probably painted for a monastery, now demolished, of the Order of Minims in what is now the place des Vosges in Paris. A painting of this subject by Champaigne is recorded in a side chapel there by Luc-Vincent Thiéry in his guide book to Paris of 1787, with a further mention from December 1790. At a later stage of the French Revolution, it was one of many religious paintings removed from church buildings to a depot in the disestablished monastery of the Petits-Augustins, which in 1795 became the Musée des Monuments français, itself dissolved in 1816.

This painting had reached the depot by November 1791, but was sold in 1797. It was very probably bought in 1801 by the great collector Cardinal Joseph Fesch, who was the half-brother of Napoleon's mother, and lived in Rome after the fall of his half-nephew in 1815. It was in the sale in Rome of Fesch's collection in 1845, returning to France, where it passed through various collections until bought by Jacques Seligmann & Company, a New York dealer, by 1950. It was then sold to the National Gallery in 1958 for a US$ amount equal at the time to £7000 (equivalent to £206,569 in 2023).

Because the ownership of the painting is uncertain between its appearances in two auctions in Paris, the first on 22 May 1919 and the second on 24 December 1948, the painting appears in a list the National Gallery maintains called "Whereabouts of paintings 1933–1945: List of works with incomplete provenance from 1933–1945".

== Exhibitions ==
After its purchase by Jacques Seligmann & Co., the painting had a busy few years, crossing the Atlantic at least four times in the 1950s, being part of an exhibition of French painting at the Carnegie Museum of Art in Pittsburgh in 1951, then an exhibition on Champaigne in Paris in 1952 (Orangerie des Tuileries), followed by a show of French paintings at Seligmann in New York in 1953.

In 1991 it was part of Paula Rego: Tales from the National Gallery, a touring exhibition of National Gallery paintings, chosen by Paula Rego, that went to Plymouth, Middlesbrough, Manchester and Barnsley.

== See also ==
- The Nativity (Champaigne), now Lille
