= Matthew 1:19 =

- ← 1:18 1:20 →
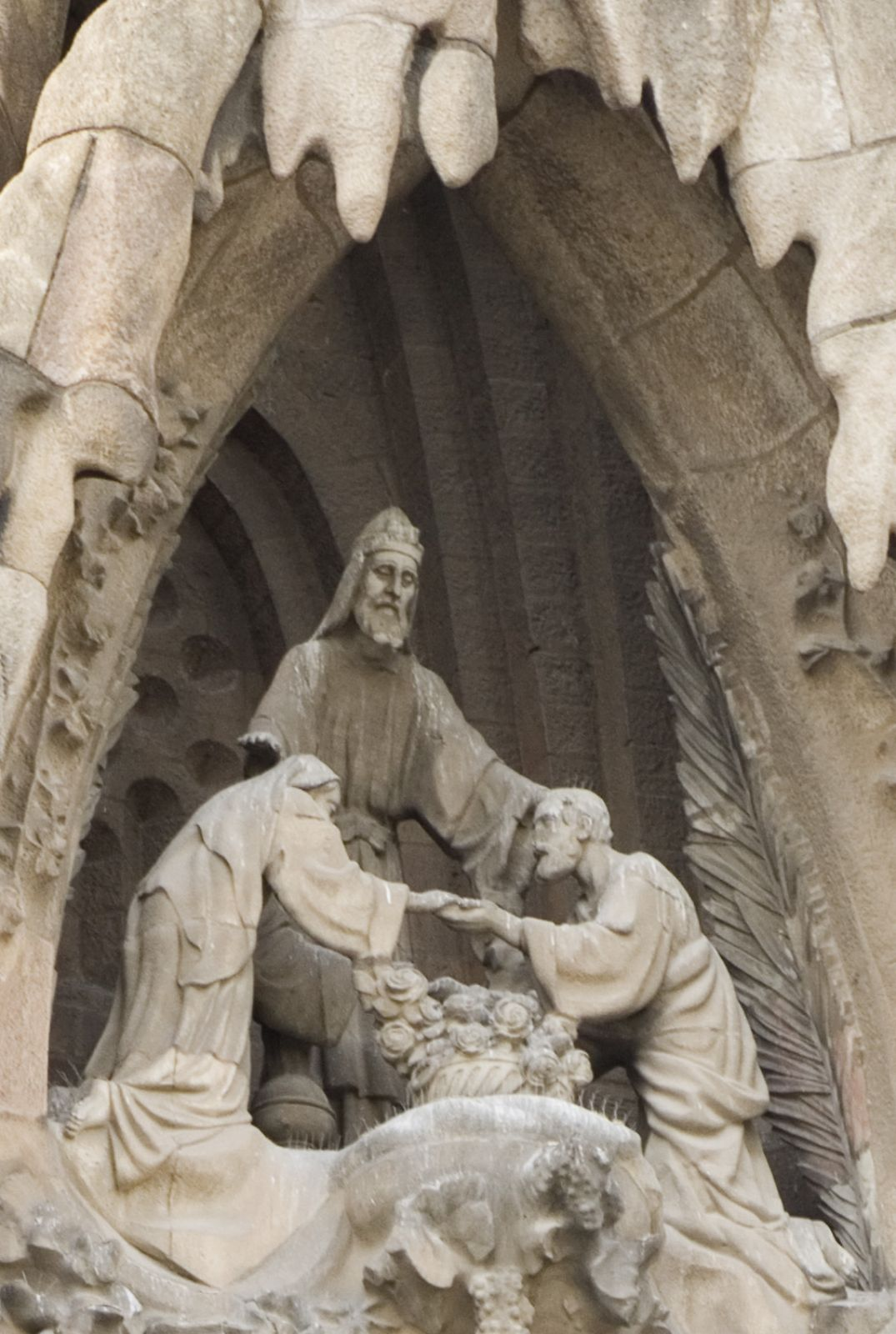
- Legendary Rendering of the Marriage between Joseph and Mary, Nativity Façade from Plaça de Gaudí, Barcelona (October 2009)
- Book: Gospel of Matthew
- Christian Bible part: New Testament

Matthew 1:19 is the nineteenth verse of the first chapter in the Gospel of Matthew in the New Testament. It is part of the description of the events surrounding the birth of Jesus. In the previous verse, Joseph has found Mary to be pregnant, and in this verse he considers leaving her.

== Content ==
The original Koine Greek, according to Westcott and Hort, reads:

ιωσηφ δε ο ανηρ αυτης δικαιος ων και μη θελων αυτην
δειγματισαι εβουληθη λαθρα απολυσαι αυτην

In the King James Version of the Bible the text reads:

Then Joseph her husband, being a just man, and not willing to
make her a public example, was minded to put her away privily.

The New International Version translates the passage as:

Because Joseph her husband was faithful to the law,
and yet did not want to expose her to public disgrace,
he had in mind to divorce her quietly.

For a collection of other versions see BibleHub Matthew 1:19.

== Analysis ==
That this verse refers to Joseph as Mary's husband does not conflict or mean a change in circumstances from Matthew 1:18, where he is merely her betrothed. The betrothal of the period was a formal arrangement and the couple can reasonably be considered husband and wife while betrothed.

Exactly what this verse means by Joseph being a "just man" is much discussed. The Greek term is dikaios, and it has variously been translated as just, righteous, upright, and of good character. Brown outlines three basic interpretations. Most of the ancient commentators of the Bible interpreted it as meaning that Joseph was law-abiding, and as such decided to divorce Mary in keeping with Mosaic Law when he found her pregnant by another. However, his righteousness was tempered by mercy and he thus kept the affair private. A second view, first put forward by Clement of Alexandria, is held by most modern Christians. This view sees Joseph's righteousness, not in his rigid adherence to the laws, but rather in his mercy itself. By this view the decision to ensure Mary was not shamed was not an exception to Joseph's righteousness, but the proof of it. By this view mercy is more righteous than obedience. A third view is based on the idea that Joseph already knew that Mary's child was divinely conceived. This is in keeping with the Gospel of Luke in which Mary is quickly told how she became pregnant. By this interpretation, Joseph's righteousness is his great piety that leads him to quickly accept Mary's story and his desire not to intrude with God's plan for his new wife.

Some scholars have tried to do away with the disquieting word divorce in this verse, and most older translations did so. Since Joseph has just been described as righteous having him consider a divorce could imply that divorce is righteous. Especially in the 19th century, a number of scholars tried to read alternate meanings into the term. One proposal was that it merely meant separate: that the couple would split but that legally they would remain married. However recent discoveries have found that legal avenues for divorce existed at the time in question. One of the clearest pieces of evidence is a divorce record from 111 AD, coincidentally between a couple named Mary and Joseph, that was found among the Dead Sea Scrolls. The Greek word here translated as divorce is aphiemi, and the only other time it appears is in 1 Corinthians 7:11 where Paul uses it to describe the legal separation of a man and wife. Almost all modern translators today feel that divorce is the best word. Today, versions that do not use the word divorce do so for doctrinaire reasons. This verse also provides one of the main scriptural justifications for divorce for churches that accept the practice. Since the marriage in question was never consummated, the divorce Joseph was contemplating does not violate the beliefs of churches, such as the Roman Catholic Church, who reject divorce.

What the verse means by privately is also open to discussion. Rabbinic law from the period gives two methods of divorce for reason of adultery. One was to bring the matter to the village council, which would hold a hearing and, if the allegations were proved, grant a divorce. The second method was to have the evidence presented and approved by two witnesses who would then certify the divorce. By quietly most scholars believe the verse means that Joseph would take the second option. Gundry argues that the witnesses were necessary to prevent a woman from denying that the divorce had taken place. Gundry believes that by quietly the verse means that even the witnesses would be forgone and the separation would be an entirely private affair.

== Commentary from the Church Fathers ==
Chrysostom: The Evangelist having said that she was found with child of the Holy Ghost, and without knowledge of man, that you should not herein suspect Christ's disciple of inventing wonders in honour of his Master, brings forward Joseph confirming the history by his own share in it; Now Joseph her husband, being a just man.

Pseudo-Augustine: Joseph, understanding that Mary was with child, is perplexed that it should be thus with her whom he had received from the temple of the Lord, and had not yet known, and resolved within himself, saying, What shall I do? Shall I proclaim it, or shall I overlook it? If I proclaim it, I am indeed not consenting to the adultery; but I am running into the guilt of cruelty, for by Moses’ law she must be stoned. If I overlook it, I am consenting to the crime, and take my portion with the adulterers. Since then it is an evil to overlook the thing, and worse to proclaim the adultery, I will put her away from being my wife.

Ambrose: St. Matthew has beautifully taught how a righteous man ought to act, who has detected his wife's disgrace; so as at once to keep himself guiltless of her blood, and yet pure from her defilements; therefore it is he says, Being a just man. Thus is preserved throughout in Joseph the gracious character of a righteous man, that his testimony may be the more approved; for, the tongue of the just speaketh the judgment of truth.

Jerome: But how is Joseph thus called just, when he is ready to hide his wife's sin? For the Law enacts, that not only the doers of evil, but they who are privy to any evil done, shall be held to be guilty.

Chrysostom: But it should be known, that just here is used to denote one who is in all things virtuous. For there is a particular justice, namely, the being free from covetousness; and another universal virtue, in which sense Scripture generally uses the word justice. Therefore, being just, that is kind, merciful, he was minded to put away privily her who according to the Law was liable not only to dismissal, but to death. But Joseph remitted both, as though living above the Law. For as the sun lightens up the world, before he shews his rays, so Christ before He was born caused many wonders to be seen.

Augustine: Otherwise; if you alone have knowledge of a sin that any has committed against you, and desire to accuse him thereof before men, you do not herein correct, but rather betray him. But Joseph, being a just man, with great mercy spared his wife, in this great crime of which he suspected her. The seeming certainty of her unchastity tormented him, and yet because he alone knew of it, he was willing not to publish it, but to send her away privily; seeking rather the benefit than the punishment of the sinner.

Jerome: Or this may be considered a testimony to Mary, that Joseph, confident in her purity, and wondering at what had happened, covered in silence that mystery which he could not explain.

Rabanus Maurus: He beheld her to be with child, whom he knew to be chaste; and because he had read, There shall come a Rod out of the stem of Jesse, (Is. 11:1.) of which he knew that Mary was comes, and had also read, Behold, a virgin shall conceive, (Is. 7:14.) he did not doubt that this prophecy should be fulfilled in her.

Origen: But if he had no suspicion of her, how could he be a just man, and yet seek to put her away, being immaculate? He sought, to put her away, because he saw in her a great sacrament, to approach which he thought himself unworthy.

Glossa Ordinaria: Or, in seeking to put her away, he was just; in that he sought it privily, is shown his mercy, defending her from disgrace; Being a just man, he was minded to put her away; and being unwilling to expose her in public, and so to disgrace her, he sought to do it privily.

Ambrose: But as no one puts away what he has not received; in that he was minded to put her away, he admits to have received her.

Glossa Ordinaria: Or, being unwilling to bring her home to his house to live with him forever, he was minded to put her away privily; that is, to change the time of their marriage. For that is true virtue, when neither mercy is observed without justice, nor justice without mercy; both which vanish when severed one from the other. Or he was just because of his faith, in that he believed that Christ should be born of a virgin; wherefore he wished to humble himself before so great a favour.

== See also ==
- Christian views on divorce

Preceded by Matthew 1:18	Gospel of Matthew; Chapter 1	Succeeded by Matthew 1:20
