= The Nativity (Champaigne) =

Painting by Philippe de Champaigne

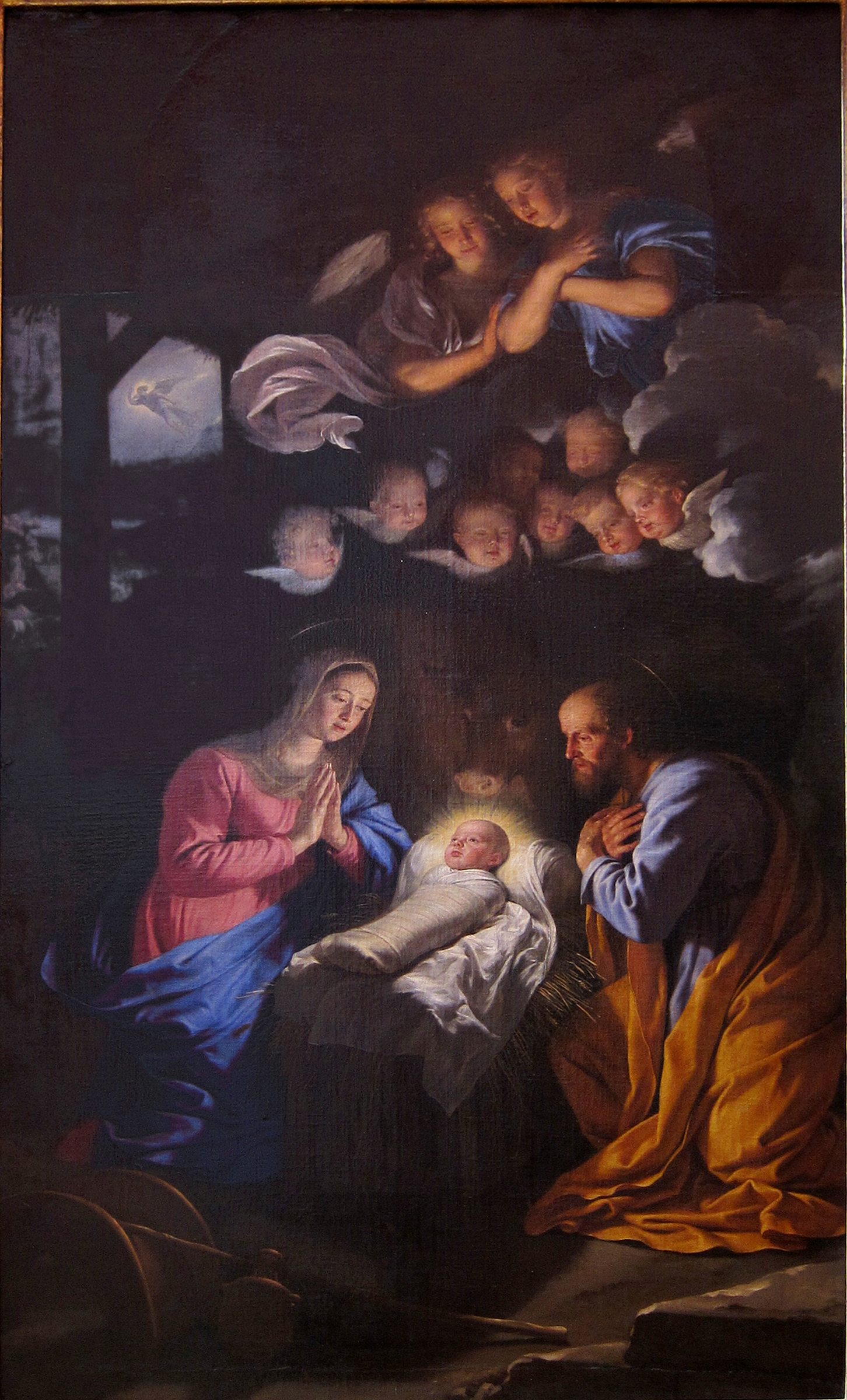
- Artist: Philippe de Champaigne
- Year: c. 1643
- Medium: oil on canvas
- Dimensions: 207 cm × 116 cm (81 in × 46 in)
- Location: Palais des Beaux-Arts de Lille; Lille

The Nativity is an oil on canvas painting by Flemish-French Philippe de Champaigne, created c. 1643. It has been in the Palais des Beaux-Arts de Lille since 1804.

== History and description ==
This painting was created around 1643 at the request of Jacques Tubeuf, superintendent of finances, to decorate the altar of his own chapel in the Oratory church in Paris. Around 1643, he had this chapel decorated by Champaigne. The Nativity occupied a central place in the chapel, flanked by paintings of the Visitation (now in the Seattle Art Museum ), Joseph's Dream (probably lost), and at the top, the Assumption of Mary (now in the Musée Thomas-Henry in Cherbourg).

After the French Revolution, the painting was seized by the revolutionary commission and taken to the depot of Petits Augustins, then to that of rue de Beaune. In 1801, it was attributed to the recently created Lille Museum of Fine Arts.

The canvas is divided into two parts. At the top, two angels on a platform of clouds and cherub heads observe the scene. Below, Mary and Joseph, accompanied by the ox and the donkey, barely visible, are in adoration before the Child Jesus, swaddled as he is described in the Gospel of Luke. In the background, a resplendent angel flies over the countryside to announce the coming of the Messiah to the shepherds. In the foreground, we can see a gourd and a walking stick which remind us that the Nativity is just a stage in the Sacred Family's journey, coming to be counted in Bethlehem.

== Analysis ==
Lorenzo Pericolo notes that Champaigne adopts, in his view, an old-fashioned approach in the treatment of the Nativity, dating back to the Middle Ages, by not representing the kings nor the shepherds who came to adore Jesus. He sees in this painting the influence of the thought of Cardinal de Bérulle, founder of the society and the church of the Oratory, for which the painting was intended. The latter expresses in fact a very particular spirituality marked in particular by the light which miraculously emanates from the Child Jesus and illuminates the face of the Virgin, the state of silent contemplation of the Virgin while facing the Child, the face, who is turned away, of Joseph who does not dare to face the Messiah, and the meditative gaze, imbued with gravity, of Christ represented as a true infant.

== See also ==
- The Dream of Saint Joseph (Champaigne)
