= Matthew 1:20 =

- ← 1:19 1:21 →
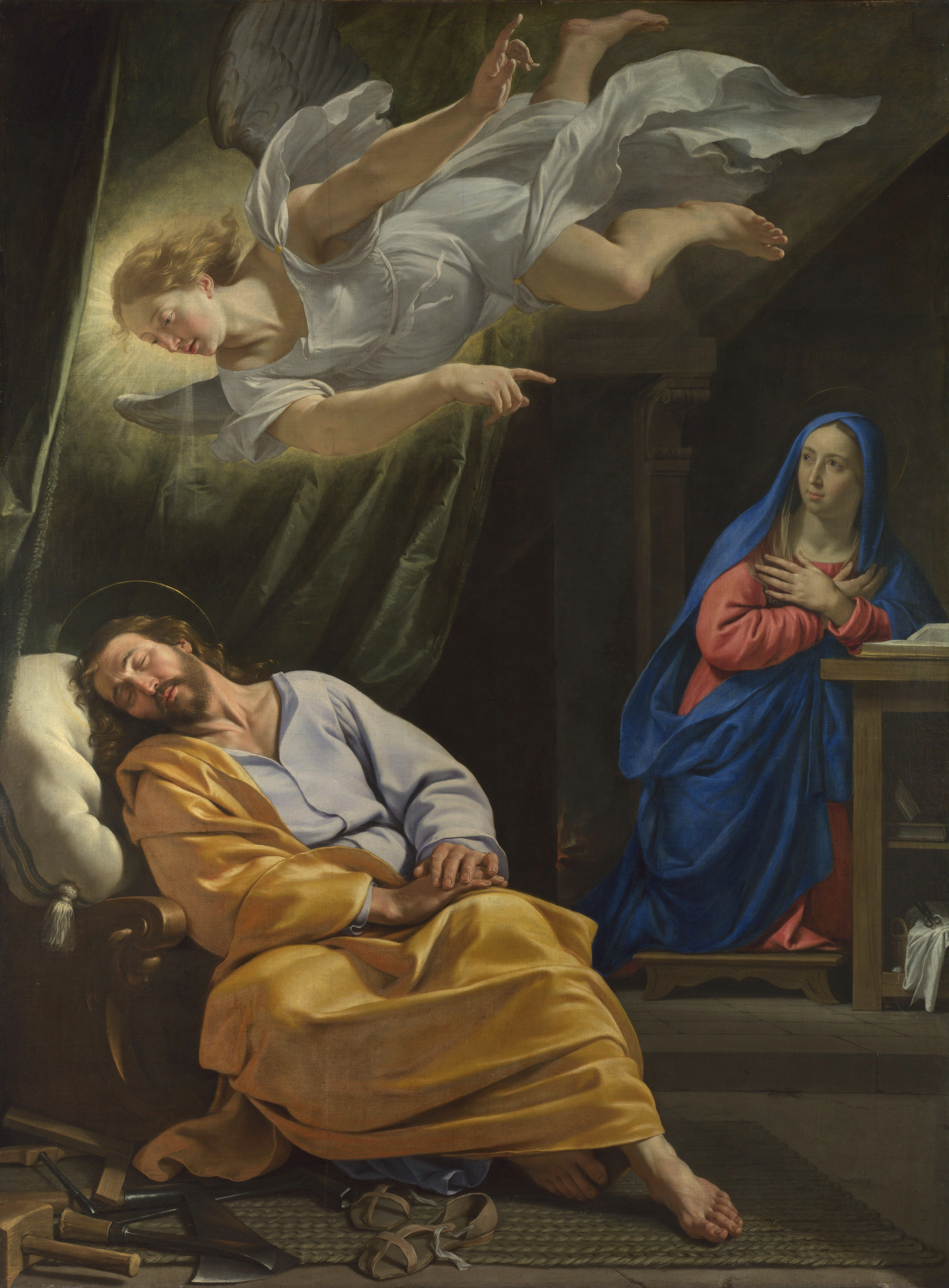
- Philippe de Champaigne's The Dream of Saint Joseph painted c. 1642-43
- Book: Gospel of Matthew
- Christian Bible part: New Testament

Matthew 1:20 is the twentieth verse of the first chapter in the Gospel of Matthew in the New Testament. Previously Joseph had found Mary to be pregnant and had considered leaving her. In this verse an angel comes to him in a dream and reassures him.

== Content ==
In the Greek text of Matthew, this verse reads:

ταυτα δε αυτου ενθυμηθεντος ιδου αγγελος κυριου κατ οναρ εφανη αυτω λεγων ιωσηφ υιος δαυιδ μη φοβηθης παραλαβειν μαριαν την γυναικα σου το γαρ εν αυτη γεννηθεν εκ πνευματος εστιν αγιου.

In the King James Version of the Bible, the text reads:

But while he thought on these
things, behold, the angel of the
LORD appeared unto him in a dream,
saying, Joseph, thou son of David,
fear not to take unto thee Mary thy
wife: for that which is conceived
in her is of the Holy Ghost.

The World English Bible translates the passage as:

But when he thought about these
things, behold, an angel of the
Lord appeared to him in a dream,
saying, "Joseph, son of David,
don't be afraid to take to yourself
Mary, your wife, for that which is
conceived in her is of the Holy Spirit.

For a collection of other versions see BibleHub Matthew 1:20.

== Analysis ==
This is the first of four dreams of Joseph recorded in Matthew. Like the others, but unlike those of the Old Testament, these dreams are very straightforward with no interpretation required.

Albright and Mann note that while the Greek word angelos is commonly translated as angel it could just as easily mean a generic divine messenger. The portrayal of an angel in this verse does not match the more common version, which has them appear as men like beings in the physical world.

The angel refers to Joseph as the "son of David", words which E. H. Plumptre refers to as significant "in the highest degree". This address again emphasizes Jesus' legal Davidic status, consistent with the genealogy set out in Matthew 1:1-17.

By "take Mary as your wife" the angel is referring to the second stage of the Jewish marriage ritual, which saw the bride move into the husband's house. The Greek text, and the content of the rest of the chapter, makes clear that take is not a euphemism for sexual relations.

Why Joseph should "fear" to love Mary is an important question. Gundry asserts that if he suspected Mary of adultery he would not be in fear. Gundry thus feels that this choice of words demonstrates that Joseph knew of the Virgin Birth before the dream and his fear was in angering God by interfering in his divine plan. This is in keeping with Luke where Mary has already been informed for some time before about the nature of her pregnancy. Boring notes that "do not be afraid" is a standard angelic opening line in the Bible, which also appears in Genesis 21:17, Matthew 28:5, Luke 1:13, Luke 1:30, and Revelation 1:17.

The same note about the use of the term Holy Spirit applies here as in verse 18. The author of Matthew refers to a divine spirit in general, not the specific nature of the Holy Ghost of the Trinity which would only be developed some time later.

The word most often translated as conceived (γεννηθεν, gennēthen) does not specifically mean biologically conceived. As in English it can also more generally mean created or imagined. Jane Schaberg argues that this verse thus does not rule out the idea that Jesus could also have had a human biological father. She notes that the same verb is used at Galatians 4:29 to refer to Isaac, and repeatedly in John's Gospel to refer to all Christians. Thus to Schaberg the verse can be read as the holy spirit influencing a child already conceived by natural means.

According to Saint Remigius, because Joseph was considering to put Mary away secretly, which if he had done, there would have been those who would have thought her to be a harlot and not a virgin, therefore this purpose of Joseph was changed through Divine revelation, and so it is said, "While he thought on these things."

Saint Ambrose notes that this verse shows the power of Him that appears, permitting Himself to be seen where and how He wishes.

Preceded by Matthew 1:19	Gospel of Matthew; Chapter 1	Succeeded by Matthew 1:21
