= Matthew 1:21 =

- ← 1:20 1:22 →
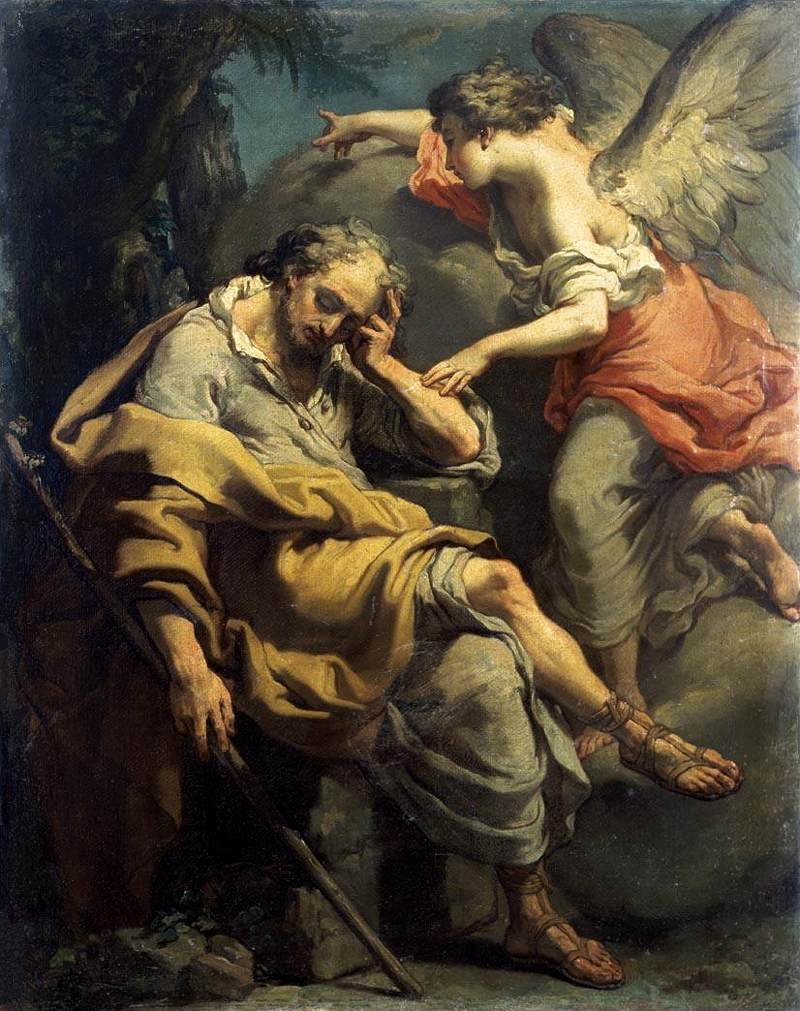
- Gaetano Gandolfi's Joseph's Dream, c. 1790
- Book: Gospel of Matthew
- Christian Bible part: New Testament

Matthew 1:21 is the twenty-first verse of the first chapter in the Gospel of Matthew in the New Testament. Joseph is being spoken to in a dream by an angel. In this verse, the angel tells Joseph to call the child "Jesus", "because he will save his people from their sins".

== Content ==
The original Koine Greek, according to Westcott and Hort, reads:

τεξεται δε υιον και καλεσεις το ονομα αυτου ιησουν αυτος
γαρ σωσει τον λαον αυτου απο των αμαρτιων αυτων
(texetai de huion kai kaleseis to onoma autou Iēsoun autos
gar sōsei ton laon autou apo tōn hamartiōn autōn)

In the King James Version of the Bible, the text reads:

And she shall bring forth a son, and thou shalt call his
name JESUS: for he shall save his people from their sins.

The World English Bible translates the passage as:

She shall bring forth a son. You shall call his name Jesus,
for it is he who shall save his people from their sins."

For a collection of other versions see BibleHub Matthew 1:21.

== Analysis ==
This verse is the first clear indication of how the author of Matthew sees Jesus. France notes that in the Old Testament only God had the power to absolve sins thus this verse shows that Jesus will be far greater than any of the prophets and other holy men.

The traditional view is that this verse clearly shows that the role of the messiah would not be one of national liberator, as most Jews had expected, but rather a spiritual liberator. Generally λαός (laos), the word translated as people, was used to refer to the Jewish people, but "his people" could also refer to all of humanity. Warren Carter disagrees with this opinion. He believes that the author of Matthew originally intended this saving to be political. To Carter the sins of bondage, Roman domination, and economic control were just as important as religious and moral sins. He argues that the rest of the infancy narrative is deeply political with its focus on the Kings of Judah and the deeply sinful King Herod. The verse was reinterpreted when the Second Coming failed to occur and liberate Israel from the empire.

Gundry sees this verse as important evidence of how the author of Matthew viewed sin and salvation. Gundry reports that there are two distinct views of sin in the New Testament. Romans 7 presents sin as a malicious external power that induces people to do evil. Matthew differs from this view. The gospel pluralizes the word sin implying that sin is not a universal force. Moreover, referring to their sins presents sin as the fault of the sinner not of an external force. Gundry argues that by the Romans definition deliverance is saving people from the influence of sin, but in Matthew deliverance is rescuing people from the punishment that will inevitably be meted out for sinning.

== Commentary from Church Fathers ==
Chrysostom: What the Angel thus told Joseph, was beyond human thought, and the law of nature, therefore he confirms his speech not only by revealing to him what was past, but also what was to come; She shall bring forth a Son.

Glossa Ordinaria: That Joseph should not suppose that he was no longer needed in this wedlock, seeing the conception had taken place without his intervention, the Angel declares to him, that though there had been no need of him in the conception, yet there was need of his guardianship; for the Virgin should bear a Son, and then he would be necessary both to the Mother and her Son; to the Mother to screen her from disgrace, to the Son to bring Him up and to circumcise Him. The circumcision is meant when he says, And thou, shalt call His name Jesus; for it was usual to give the name in circumcision.

Pseudo-Chrysostom: He said not, Shall bear thee a Son, as to Zacharias, Behold, Elisabeth thy wife shall bear thee a son. For the woman who conceives of her husband, bears the son to her husband, because he is more of him than of herself; but she who had not conceived of man, did not bear the Son to her husband, but to herself.

Chrysostom: Or, he left it unappropriated, to show that she bare Him to the whole world.

Rabanus Maurus: Thou shalt call His name, he says, and not, “shalt give Him a name,” for His name had been given from all eternity.

Chrysostom: This further shows that this birth should be wonderful, because it is God that sends down His name from above by His Angel; and that not any name, but one which is a treasure of infinite good. Therefore, also the Angel interprets it, suggesting good hope, and by this induces him to believe what was spoken. For we lean more easily to prosperous things, and yield our belief more readily to good fortune.

Jerome: Jesus is a Hebrew word, meaning Saviour. He points to the etymology of the name, saying, For He shall save His people from their sins.

Saint Remigius: He shows the same man to be the Saviour of the whole world, and the Author of our salvation. He saves indeed not the unbelieving, but His people; that is, He saves those that believe on Him, not so much from visible as from invisible enemies; that is, from their sins, not by fighting with arms, but by remitting their sins.

Peter Chrysologus: Let them approach to hear this, who ask, Who is He that Mary bare? He shall save His people; not any other man’s people; from what? from their sins. That it is God that forgives sins, if you do not believe the Christians so affirming, believe the infidels, or the Jews who say, None can forgive sins but God only. (Luke 5:1.)

Preceded by Matthew 1:20	Gospel of Matthew; Chapter 1	Succeeded by Matthew 1:22
