= Matthew 1:18 =

- ← 1:17 1:19 →
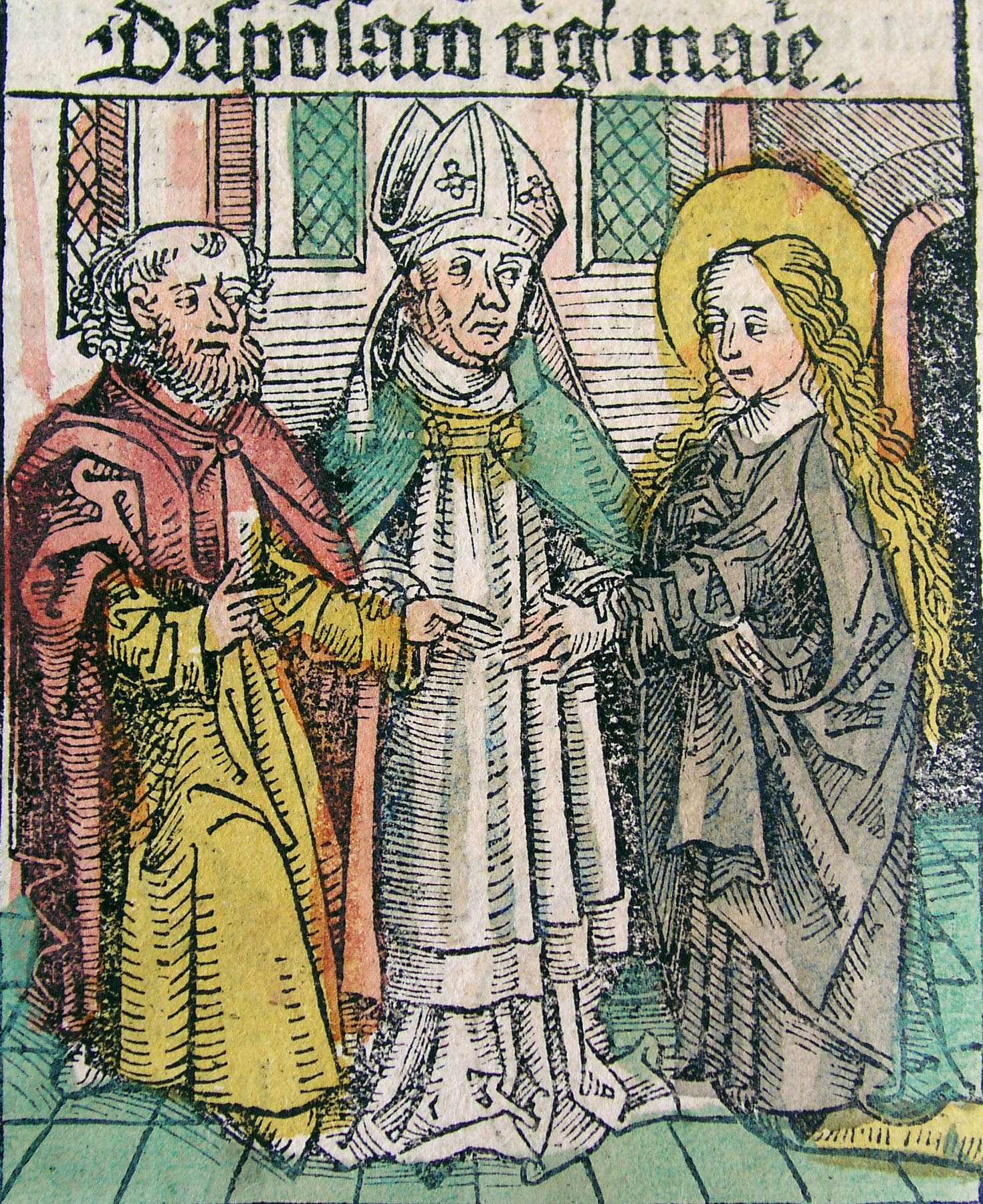
- A medieval depiction of the betrothal of Mary and Joseph from the Nuremberg Chronicle
- Book: Gospel of Matthew
- Christian Bible part: New Testament

Matthew 1:18 is the eighteenth verse of the first chapter in the Gospel of Matthew in the New Testament. This verse opens the description of the events surrounding the birth of Jesus.

== Text ==
The original Koine Greek, according to Westcott and Hort, reads:

του δε [ιησου] χριστου η γενεσις ουτως
ην μνηστευθεισης της μητρος αυτου μαριας
τω ιωσηφ πριν η συνελθειν αυτους ευρεθη
εν γαστρι εχουσα εκ πνευματος αγιου

In the King James Version of the Bible the text reads:

Now the birth of Jesus Christ was
on this wise: When as his mother
Mary was espoused to Joseph, before
they came together, she was found
with child of the Holy Ghost.

The World English Bible translates the passage as:

Now the birth of Jesus Christ was
like this; for after his mother,
Mary, was engaged to Joseph,
before they came together, she was
found pregnant by the Holy Spirit.

For a collection of other versions see BibleHub Matthew 1:18

== Analysis ==
As the previous verses contained nothing but a summary of Jesus' genealogy, this verse is the beginning of the narrative of Matthew, and has often been considered the true opening verse of the gospel. Boring notes that this verse is not part of the narrative to come, but is an initial introduction bringing the reader up to date on where things stand at the beginning of Matthew's story.

The word translated as birth, geneseos, is the same term that is used in Matthew 1:1. English editions invariably give different translations for the two, but the author of Matthew may have been trying to link the two verses with the second geneseos symbolically beginning the second section of the chapter.

The word translated as espoused, engaged, or most often betrothed refers to a specific institution of the period very different from the modern idea of an engagement. This period occurred after the main marriage ceremony had taken place and the marriage contracts had been signed. Dissolution thus required a formal divorce or the death of one partner. In general the betrothal ceremony took place when the woman was still very young, generally around age twelve or thirteen. After the ceremony she would remain in their father's house for around a year, and this period is what is referred to in this verse.

The second stage of the marriage was for the husband to take his bride into his own home. Most scholars believe this is what the phrase "coming together" means in this verse. It is not thought to be a euphemism for sexual relations, even though it could be interpreted in this way. Only after the bride moved into her husband's house would the marriage be consummated. In Judea sexual relations during the betrothal were not unheard of. In Galilee, however, much stricter conventions prevailed. Any infidelity with an outside partner during the betrothal period was considered adultery, and punished as such under Mosaic Law. Thus when Mary became pregnant she was at a point prior to which she would have had relations with her husband but also a time in which infidelity would be harshly punished, potentially by death.

Matthew does not relate the events surrounding the conception of Jesus, rather he takes the event as having already happened. To Schweizer this signals that Matthew was writing for an audience that was already well aware of story of the Virgin Birth. Schweizer also observes that the author of Matthew seems rather nonplussed by the Virgin Birth. While today modern scientifically oriented Christians find the Virgin Birth one of the more implausible parts of the Gospel, Schweizer believes that attitudes would have been very different at the time Matthew was writing. There were several Virgin Birth stories in the Jewish tradition and the idea of virgin births was generally accepted by the population.

Matthew mentions the paternity of the Holy Ghost very quickly, even before any of the characters in his narrative are aware of this fact. Brown argues that this is because Matthew does not want the reader to consider alternate scenarios as to how Mary could have become pregnant. Jane Schaberg sees this as an apologetic addition, to counter claims of Jesus' illegitimacy that were current among anti-Christian writings of the time, such as the Toledot Yeshu. She links this to Matthew 28, where the author of Matthew tries to rebut the theory that Jesus' body was stolen.

Despite the capital letters most editions give the phrase, Matthew does not mean the Holy Ghost as understood in modern theology. The modern notion of the Trinity developed over time. The phrase can be read as either "the holy spirit" or "a holy spirit." In Greek the term Holy Ghost is gender neutral and in Semitic languages it is female. This reduces the idea of actual copulation, as was traditional between pagan gods and mortal women. Feminist scholar Levine sees much importance in Jesus being the child of a woman and feminine spirit. She sees this as a rejection of the traditional patriarchal model for the family. Wainwright also sees the act of creating a child without the need for a mortal man as a challenge to the androcentric social order. Schaberg disagrees with this approach, writing that Mary is represented in these verses as nothing more than a vehicle reproduction, a very traditional societal role.

== Chi Rho monogram ==
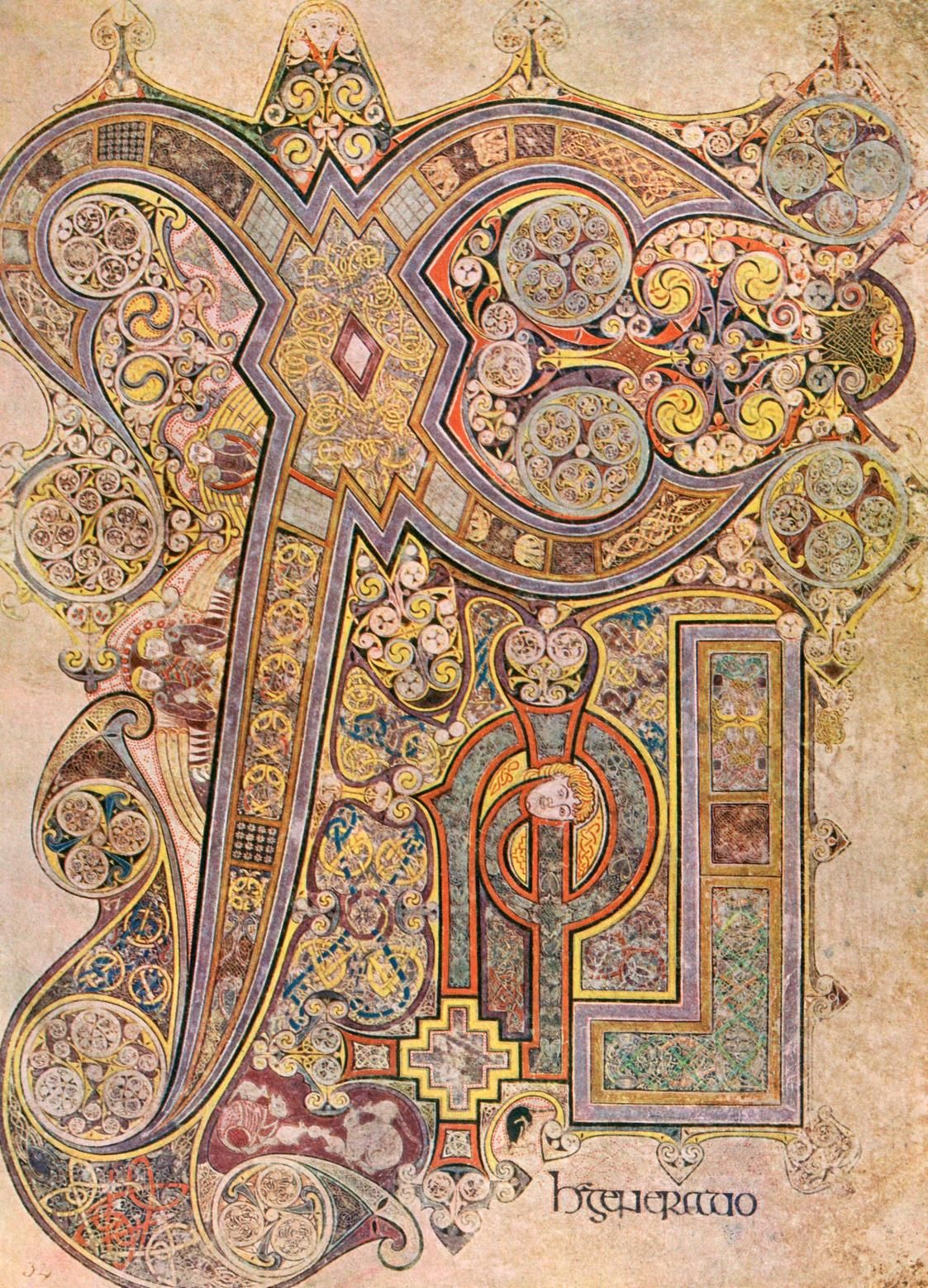
The Chi Rho monogram from the Book of Kells is the most lavish such monogram

In Insular Gospel Books (that is those books produced in monasteries Ireland, England and Scotland or on the continent in monasteries founded by Irish missionaries) this verse has an importance not seen in other medieval Gospel Books. In the Vulgate (which was used in these books), the verse reads:

Christi autem generatio sic erat cum esset desponsata mater eius Maria Ioseph antequam convenirent inventa est in utero habens de Spiritu Sancto

In medieval writing the word Christ was often abbreviated using the Greek letters Chi (X) and Rho (P). The word Christi (of Christ) was then written XPi. The verses Matthew 1:1 through Matthew 1:17 give the genealogy of Christ, with the actual narrative of Christ's birth starting at Matthew 1:18. Insular scribes treated Matthew 1:1-17 as an almost separate work from the rest of Matthew. Insular scribes also started a tradition of giving the opening few words of each of the Gospels an elaborate decorative treatment (see this example from the Lindisfarne Gospels). Accordingly, the Insular scribes gave the opening Chi Rho monogram an increasingly elaborate decoration. This trend culminated in the Book of Kells (pictured), where the monogram has taken over the entire page. Although later scribes (such as those of the Carolingian Renaissance) followed the Insular tradition of giving elaborate decorative treatments to the opening words of texts, including the Gospels, they did not follow the tradition of decoration this verse. The presence of a decorated Chi Rho monogram within a manuscript can then be seen as indicative of Insular influence.

== Commentary from Church Fathers ==
Irenaeus: Now the Gospels, in which Christ is enthroned, are like these. ..... Matthew proclaims his human birth, saying, 'The book of the generation of Jesus Christ, son of David, son of Abraham,' and, 'The birth of Jesus Christ was in this manner' . for this Gospel is manlike, and so through the whole Gospel [Christ] appears as a man of a humble mind, and gentle.

Preceded by Matthew 1:17	Gospel of Matthew; Chapter 1	Succeeded by Matthew 1:19
