= Flight into Egypt =

Biblical story about the flight of Joseph, Mary and the infant Jesus

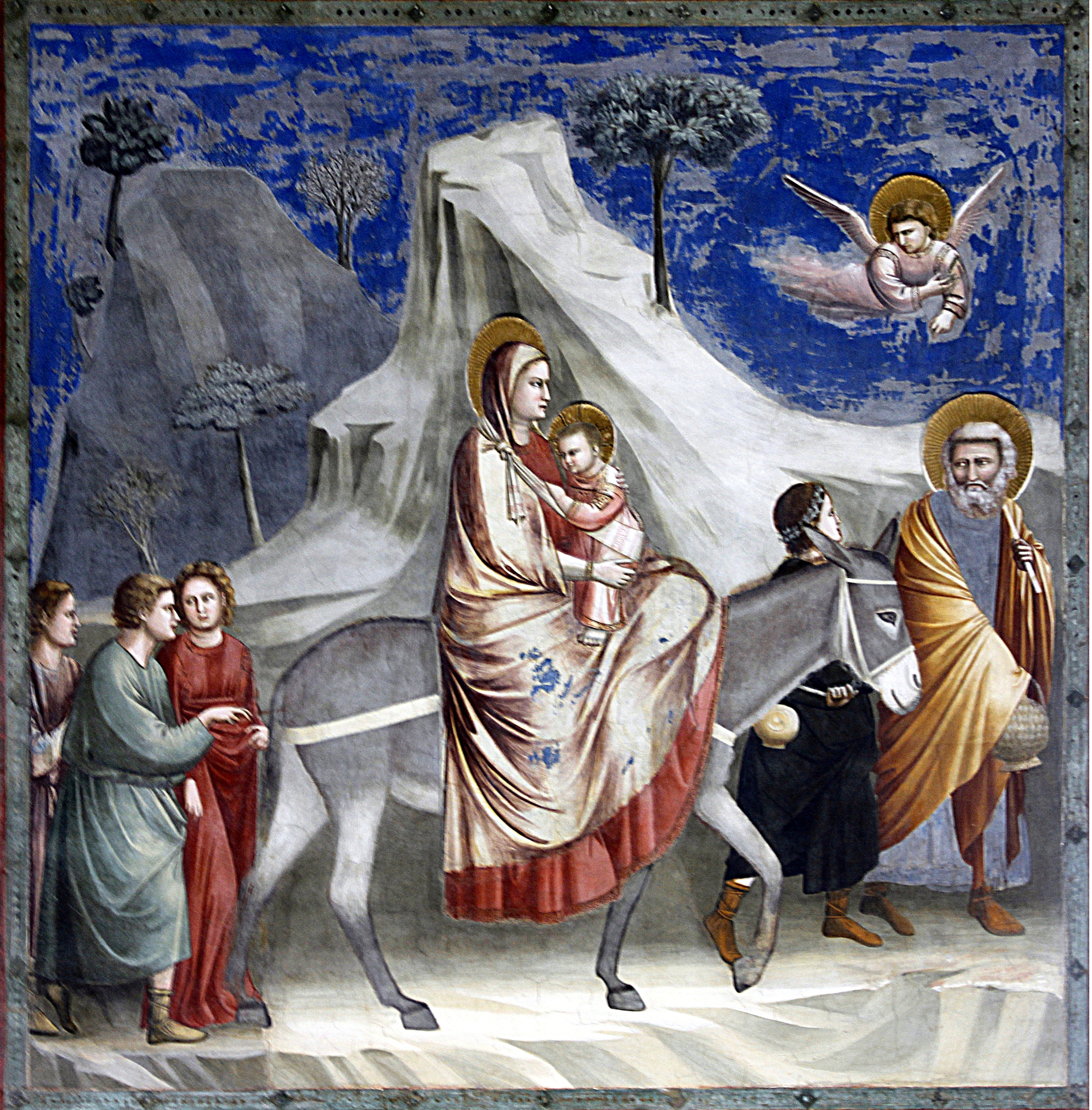
The Flight into Egypt by Giotto di Bondone (1304–1306, Scrovegni Chapel, Padua)

The flight into Egypt is a story recounted in the Gospel of Matthew (Matthew 2:13–23) and in New Testament apocrypha. Soon after the visit by the Magi, an angel appeared to Joseph in a dream telling him to flee to Egypt with Mary and the infant Jesus since King Herod would seek the child to kill him. The episode is frequently shown in art, as the final episode of the Nativity of Jesus in art, and was a common component in cycles of the Life of the Virgin as well as the Life of Christ. Within the narrative tradition, iconic representation of the "Rest on the Flight into Egypt" developed after the 14th century.

== Matthew's gospel account ==
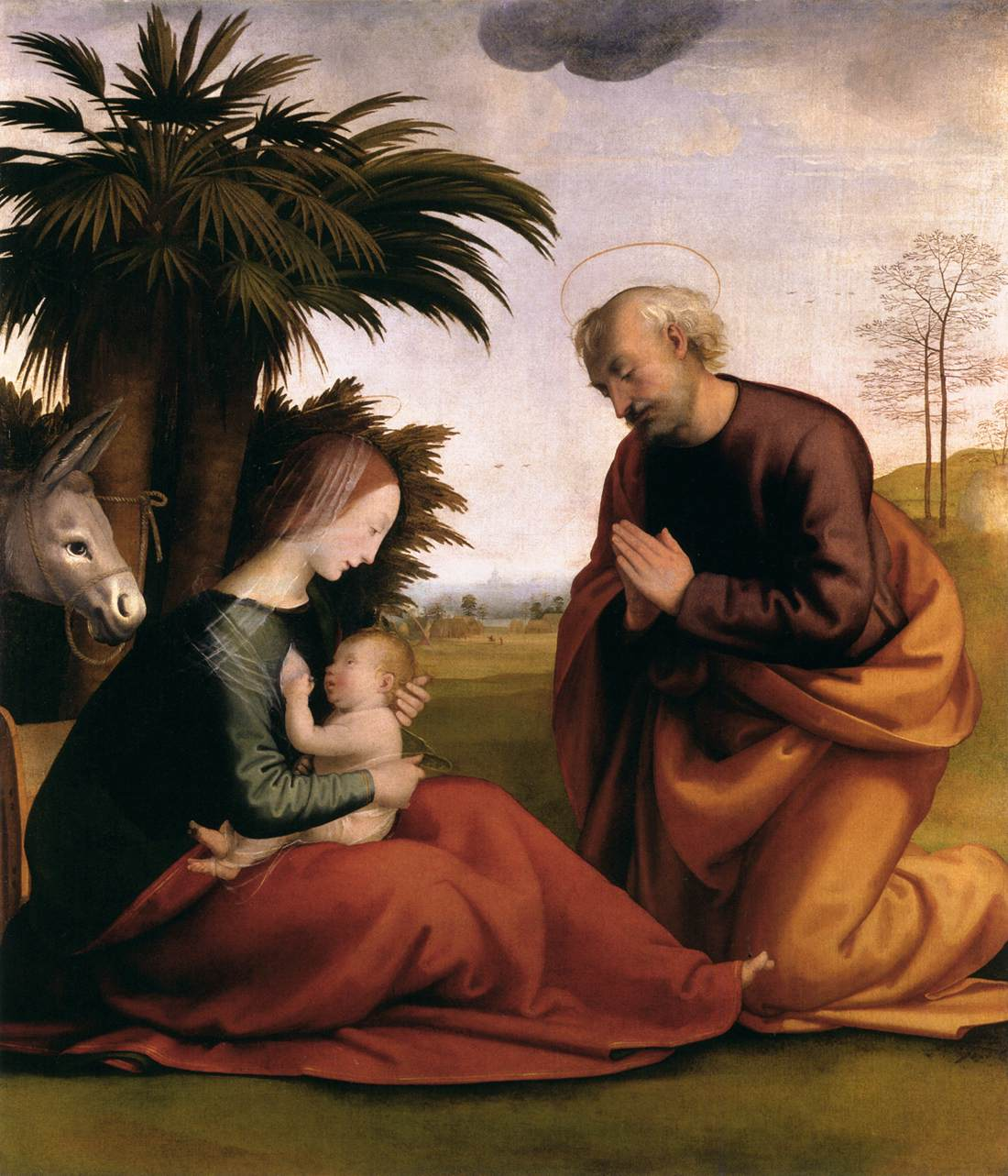
Fra Bartolomeo, Rest on the Flight into Egypt, c. 1500 (Pienza)

=== The flight from Herod ===
When the Magi came in search of Jesus, they went to Herod the Great in Jerusalem to ask where to find the newborn "King of the Jews". Herod became paranoid that the child would threaten his throne and sought to kill him (2:1–8). Herod initiated the Massacre of the Innocents in hopes of killing the child (Matthew 2:16). But an angel appeared to Joseph in a dream and warned him to take Jesus and his mother into Egypt (Matthew 2:13).

Egypt was a logical place to find refuge, as it was outside the dominions of King Herod, but both Egypt and Judea were part of the Roman Empire, linked by a coastal road known as "the way of the sea", making travel between them easy and relatively safe.

=== Return from Egypt ===
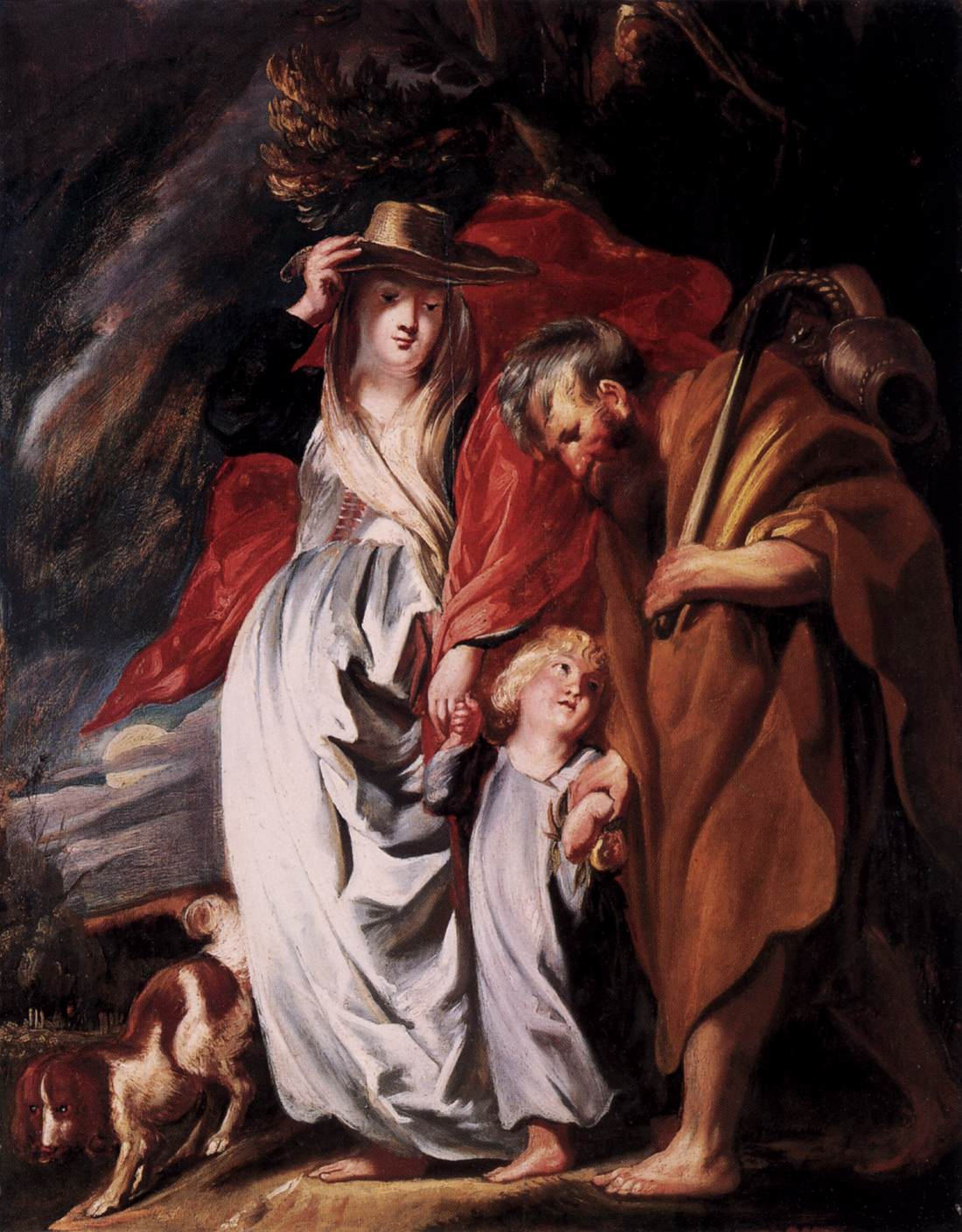
The Return of the Holy Family from Egypt by Jacob Jordaens (c. 1616)

After a time, the holy family returned from Egypt. The text states that Herod had died. Herod is believed to have died in 4 BC, and while Matthew does not mention how, the Jewish historian Josephus vividly relates a gory death.

The land that the holy family return to is identified as Judah, the only place in the entire New Testament where Judah acts as a geographic description of the whole of Judah and Galilee (Matthew 2:20), rather than referring to a collection of religious people or the Jewish people in general. It is, however, to Judah that they are described as initially returning, although upon discovering that Archelaus had become the new king, they went instead to Galilee. Historically, Archelaus was such a violent and aggressive king that in the year 6 AD he was deposed by the Romans, in response to complaints from the population.

=== Prophecy of Hosea ===
Matthew 2:15 cites Hosea 11:1 as prophetically fulfilled in the return of Joseph, Mary and Jesus from Egypt:

"... and out of Egypt I called My son".

Matthew's use of Hosea 11:1 has been explained in several ways. A sensus plenior approach states that the text in Hosea contains a meaning intended by God and acknowledged by Matthew, but unknown to Hosea. A typological reading interprets the fulfillment as found in the national history of Israel and the antitypical fulfillment as found in the personal history of Jesus. Matthew's use of typological interpretation may also be seen in his use of Isaiah 7:14 and 9:1, and Jeremiah 31:15. Thus according to the Ignatius Catholic Study Bible, "Hosea 11.1 points back to the Exodus, where God's 'first-born son' (Ex 4:22), Israel, was delivered from slavery under the oppressive Pharaoh. Matthew sees this text also pointing forward, when Jesus, the eternal first-born Son (Rom 8:29), is delivered from the tyrant Herod and later brought out of Egypt (2:21)." Likewise, The Orthodox Study Bible states that the citation of Hosea 11.1 "refers first to Israel being brought out of captivity. In the Old Testament 'son' can refer to the whole nation of Israel. Here Jesus fulfills this calling as the true Son of God by coming out of Egypt. The Anglican scholar N. T. Wright has pointed out that "The narrative exhibits several points of contact with exodus and exile traditions where Jesus' infancy recapitulates a new exodus and the end of exile, marking him out further as the true representative of Israel."

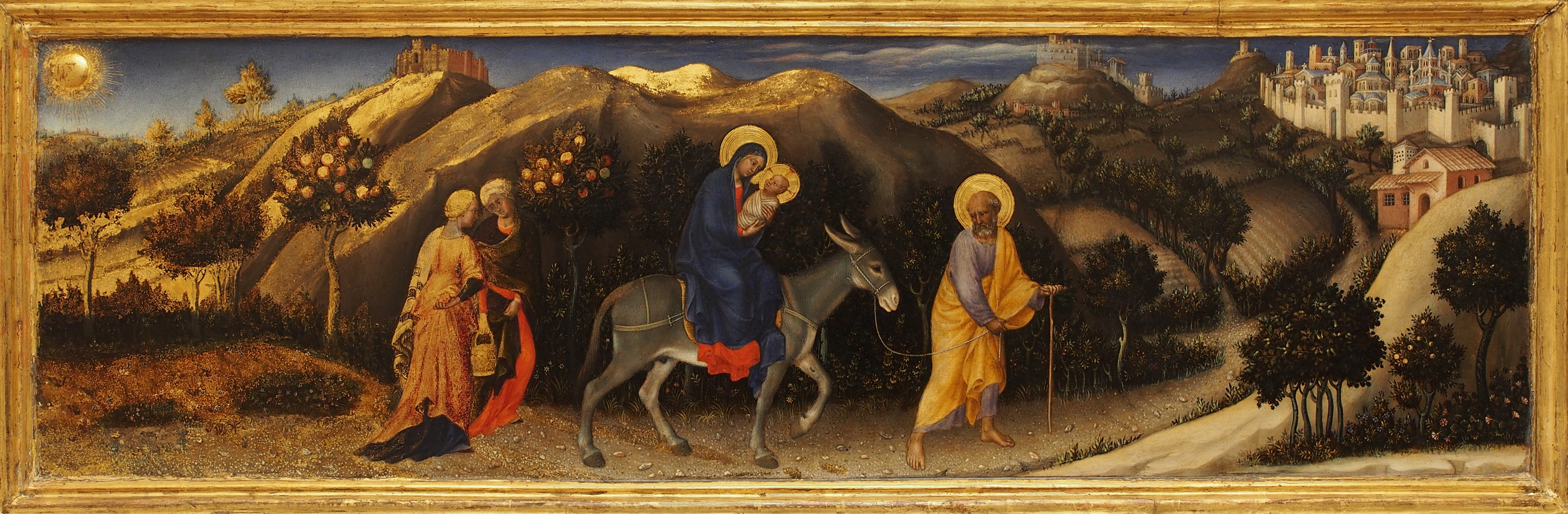
Flight into Egypt, by Gentile da Fabriano (1423)

Another reading of Hosea's prophetic declaration is that it only recounts God summoning of the nation of Israel out of Egypt during the Exodus, referring to Israel as God's son in accordance with Moses' declaration to Pharaoh:

"Israel is my first-born son; let my son go, that he may serve me" (Exodus 4:22–23).

The Masoretic Text reads my son, whereas the Septuagint reads his sons or his children; the Masoretic Text is to be preferred, the singular being both consonant with the other words which are in the singular in Hosea 11:1 and with the reference to Exodus 4:22–23. The Septuagint reading may be explained as having been made to conform to the plurals of Hosea 11:2, they and them.

== Historicity ==
The Gospel of Luke does not recount this story, relating instead that the Holy Family went to the Temple in Jerusalem, and then home to Nazareth. Followers of the Jesus Seminar thus conclude that both Luke's and Matthew's birth and infancy accounts are fabrications. A theme of Matthew is likening Jesus to Moses for a Judean audience, and the Flight into Egypt illustrates just that theme.

Regarding Matthew's infancy narrative, the 20th-century British scholar William Neil has said that "when we look beneath the engaging poetic decor, we come face to face with highly probable history. ... The flight of the Holy Family to nearby Egypt until after Herod's death, and the reason for their settling in Galilee on their return, apart altogether from Luke's information that Nazareth was their home, are also circumstantially probable."

In their commentary on Matthew in the Anchor Bible Series, W. F. Albright and C. S. Mann state that "there is no reason to doubt the historicity of the story of the family's flight into Egypt. The Old Testament abounds in references to individuals and families taking refuge in Egypt, in flight either from persecution or revenge, or in the face of economic pressure."

The British scholar R. T. France has also argued in support of the historicity of the narrative. "[Joseph's] choice of Egypt as a place of exile ... was in line with the practice of other Palestinians who feared reprisals from the government; as a neighbouring country with a sizeable Jewish population it was an obvious refuge. And his subsequent avoidance of Judea under Archelaus, and expectation of safety in Galilee, accords with the political circumstances as we know them."

== Extra-Biblical accounts ==
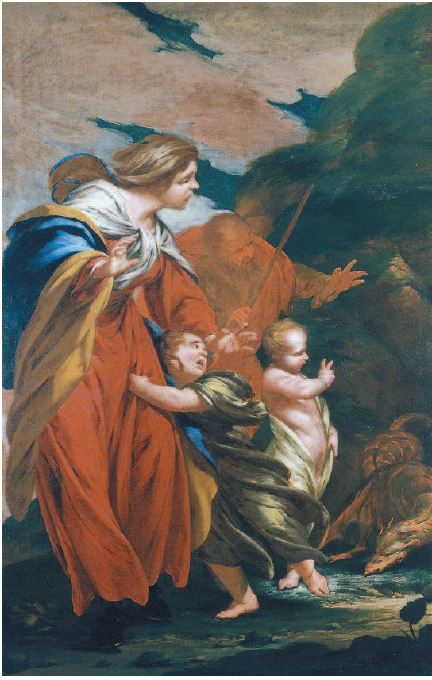
Christ calms the dragons by Giovanni Battista Lucini (1680–81)

=== Christian ===
The story was much elaborated in the infancy gospels of the New Testament apocrypha with, for example, palm trees bowing before the infant Jesus, Jesus taming dragons, the beasts of the desert paying him homage, and an encounter with the two thieves who would later be crucified alongside Jesus. In these later tales the family was joined by Salome as Jesus' nurse. These stories of the time in Egypt have been especially important to the Coptic Orthodox Church, which is based in Egypt, and throughout Egypt, there are a number of churches and shrines marking places where the family stayed. The most important of these is the Saints Sergius and Bacchus Church, which is claimed to have been built on the place where the family had its home.

One of the most extensive and, in Eastern Christianity, influential accounts of the Flight appears in the perhaps seventh-century Gospel of Pseudo-Matthew, in which Mary, tired by the heat of the sun, rested beneath a palm tree. The infant Jesus then miraculously has the palm tree bend down to provide Mary with its fruit, and release from its roots a spring to provide her with water.

According to Ethiopian Orthodox tradition, they then travelled to Ethiopia, where they were warmly hosted by the native inhabitants.

Our Holy Mother delighted in the kindness and love of Ethiopians. Our Lord then endowed Lady Virgin Saint Mary, our Country Ethiopia, as a tithe. He has also blessed the Ethiopian and Egyptian monasteries and established other monasteries as well.

=== Muslim ===
The Quran does not include the tradition of the Flight into Egypt, though Al-Muʼminun verse 50 could conceivably allude to it: "And we made the son of Maryam and his mother a sign; and we made them abide in an elevated place, full of quiet and watered with springs." However, its account of the birth of Jesus is very similar to the account of the Flight in the Gospel of Pseudo-Matthew: Mary gives birth leaning against the trunk of a date palm, which miraculously provides her with dates and a stream. It is therefore thought that one tradition owes something to the other.

Numerous later Muslim writers on the life of Jesus did transmit stories about the Flight into Egypt. Prominent examples include Abu Ishaq al-Tha'labi, whose ʿArāʾis al-madjālis fī ḳiṣaṣ al-anbiyāʾ, an account of the lives of the prophets, reports the Flight, followed by a stay in Egypt of twelve years; and al-Tabari's History of the Prophets and Kings.

== Liturgical commemorations ==
The Coptic Orthodox Church commemorates the "Entry of the Lord into Egypt" on 24 Pashons (1 June on the Gregorian calendar). The Eastern Orthodox Churches and Greek Catholic Churches commemorate the Flight into Egypt on 26 December. The pre-1962 editions of the Roman Missal of the Catholic Church provide a Mass commemorating the event for 17 February. The Maronite Catholic Church commemorates the Flight into Egypt on 29 December and the "Return from Egypt into Nazareth" on 30 December.

The Ethiopian and Eritrean Orthodox Tewahedo Church commemorates the flight from October 6 to November 15. Every Sunday, the church celebrates with a night prayer and services. The church calls the period "Zemene Tsege" or "the period of flowers, by linking the growth of flowers on the Ethiopian land with the symbolic representation of Mary and Jesus. Some followers spent the period in fasting to remember the holy Family's suffering and challenges.

== In art ==
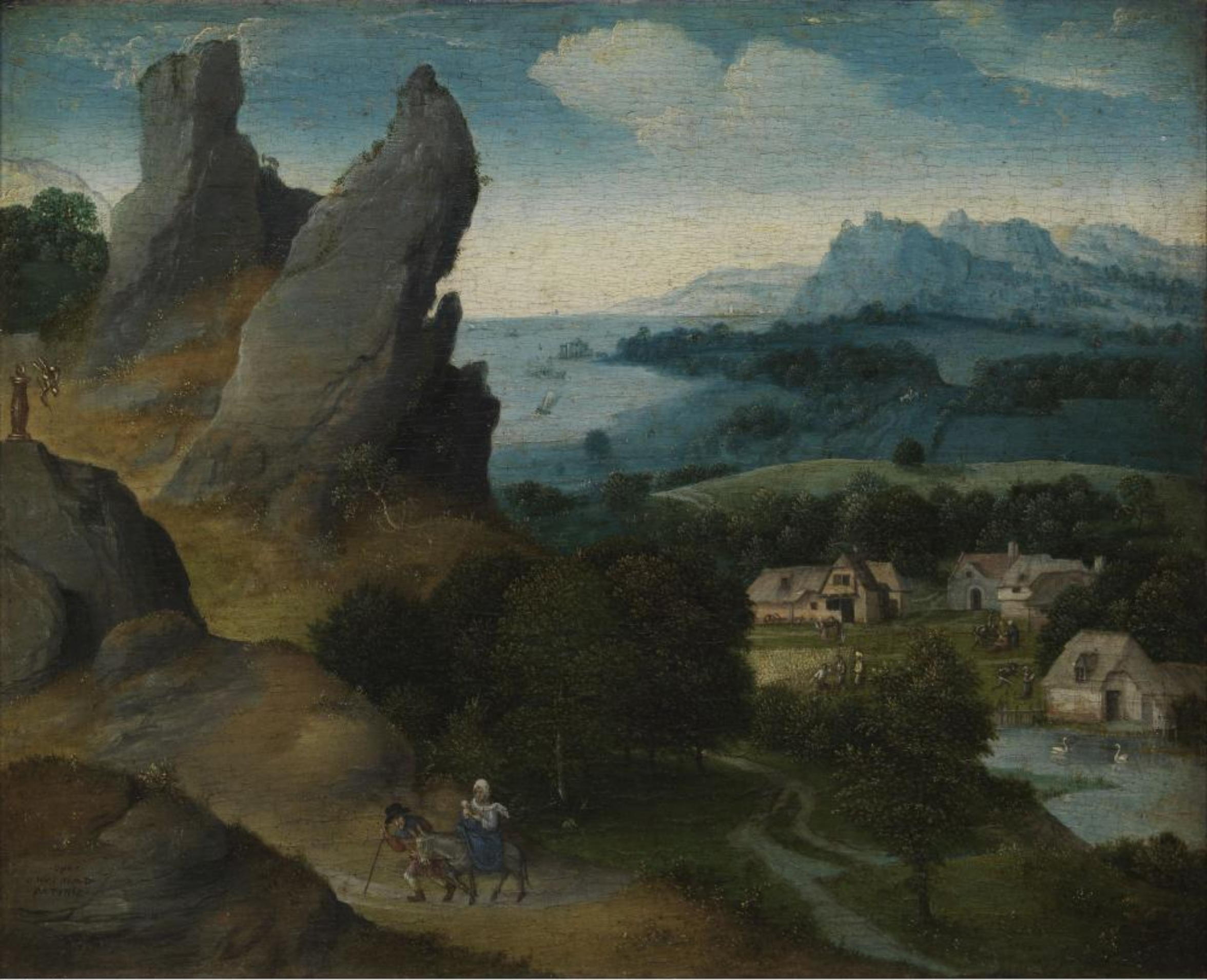
Joachim Patinir, 1510s (?), the inventor of the world landscape, painted several versions of the subject. At right the miracle of the corn, at top left the falling idol

The Flight into Egypt was a popular subject in art, showing Mary with the baby on a donkey, led by Joseph, borrowing the older iconography of the rare Byzantine Journey to Bethlehem. Nevertheless, Joseph is sometimes holding the child on his shoulders. Before about 1525, it usually formed part of a larger cycle, whether of the Nativity, or the Life of Christ or Life of the Virgin.

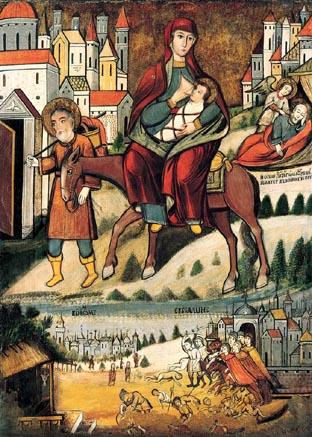
Russian icon of the Flight into Egypt; the bottom section shows the idols of Egypt miraculously falling down before Jesus and being smashed (17th century).

From the 15th century in the Netherlands onwards, the non-Biblical subject of the Holy Family resting on the journey, the Rest on the Flight into Egypt became popular, by the late 16th century perhaps more common than the original traveling family. The family were often accompanied by angels, and in earlier images sometimes an older boy who may represent James the Brother of the Lord, interpreted as a son of Joseph, by a previous marriage.

The background to these scenes usually (until the Council of Trent tightened up on such additions to scripture) included a number of apocryphal miracles, and gave an opportunity for the emerging genre of landscape painting. In the Miracle of the corn, the pursuing soldiers interrogated peasants, asking when the Holy Family passed by. The peasants truthfully said it was when they were sowing their wheat seed, causing the soldiers to abandon the chase as they thought that the Holy Family passed by months ago; however, unbeknownst to the soldiers, the farmers actually sowed their seed the day before and the wheat miraculously grew to full height overnight. In the Miracle of the idol a pagan statue fell from its plinth as the infant Jesus passed by, and a spring gushed up from the desert (originally separate, these are often combined). In other less commonly seen legends, a group of robbers abandoned their plan to rob the travelers, and a date palm tree bent down to allow them to pluck the fruit.

During the 16th century, as interest in landscape painting grew, the subject became popular as an individual subject for paintings, often with the figures small in a large landscape. The subject was especially popular with German Romantic painters, and later in the 19th century was one of a number of New Testament subjects which lent themselves to Orientalist treatment. Unusually, the 18th century artist Gianbattista Tiepolo produced a whole series of etchings with 24 scenes from the flight, most just showing different views of the Holy Family travelling.

A subject taking place after the arrival in Egypt is the meeting of the infant Jesus with his cousin, the infant John the Baptist, who, according to legend was rescued from Bethlehem before the massacre by the Archangel Uriel, and joined the Holy Family in Egypt. This meeting of the two Holy Children was to be painted by many artists during the Renaissance period, after being popularized by Leonardo da Vinci and then Raphael with works like Leonardo's Virgin of the Rocks.

Two plays of the medieval Ordo Rachelis cycle contain an account of the flight into Egypt, and the one found in the Fleury Playbook contains the only dramatic representation of the return from Egypt.

== In music ==
The oratorio L'enfance du Christ (1854) by French composer Hector Berlioz relates the events from Herod's dream and his meeting with the Magi through the angels' warning and the flight into Egypt until the Holy Family arrive at Sais.

Two choral works by the German composer Max Bruch take the flight into Egypt as their theme – The Flight of the Holy Family (1863) and The Flight into Egypt (1871).

The German composer Valentin Ruckebier wrote an opera called The Flight To Egypt which was produced and performed in 2021/22 at Teatro Comunale Modena, Linz State Theatre and Serbian National Theatre Novi Sad.

== Gallery ==
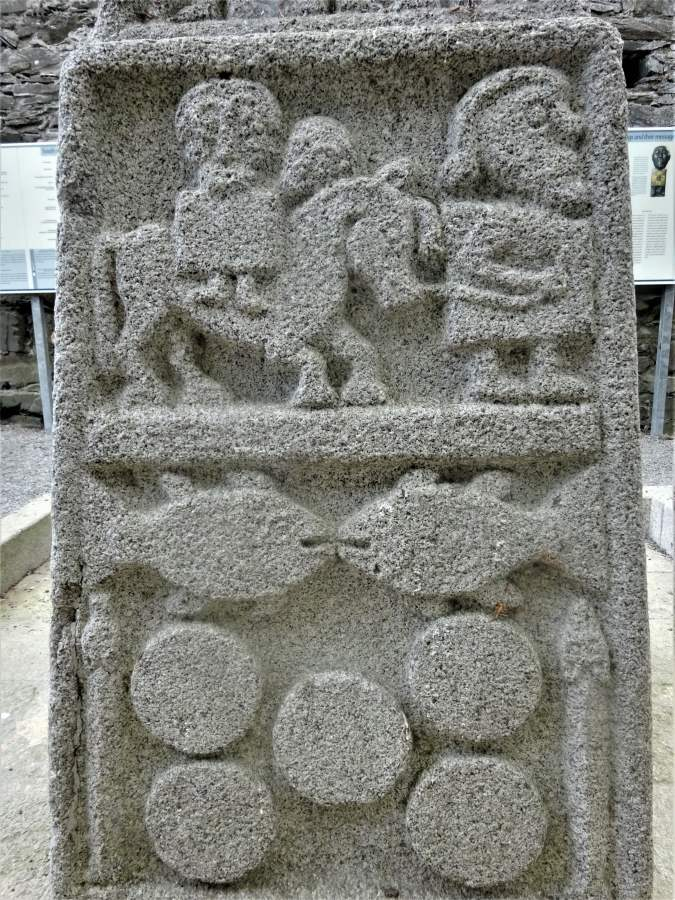
The Flight into Egypt (top), depicted on Moone High Cross, Ireland (10th century)

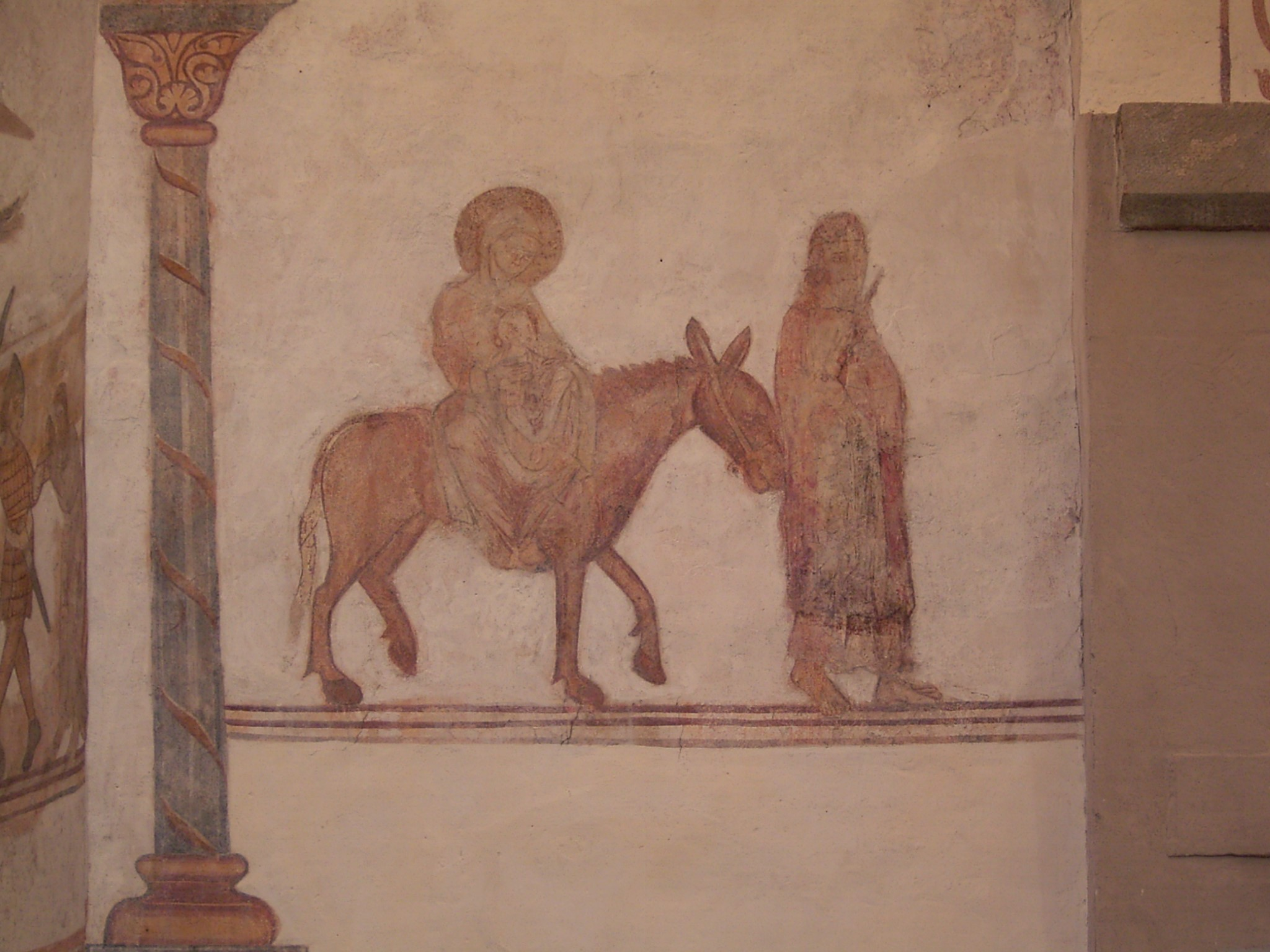
Simple medieval wall painting in a German church in Bochum-Stiepel

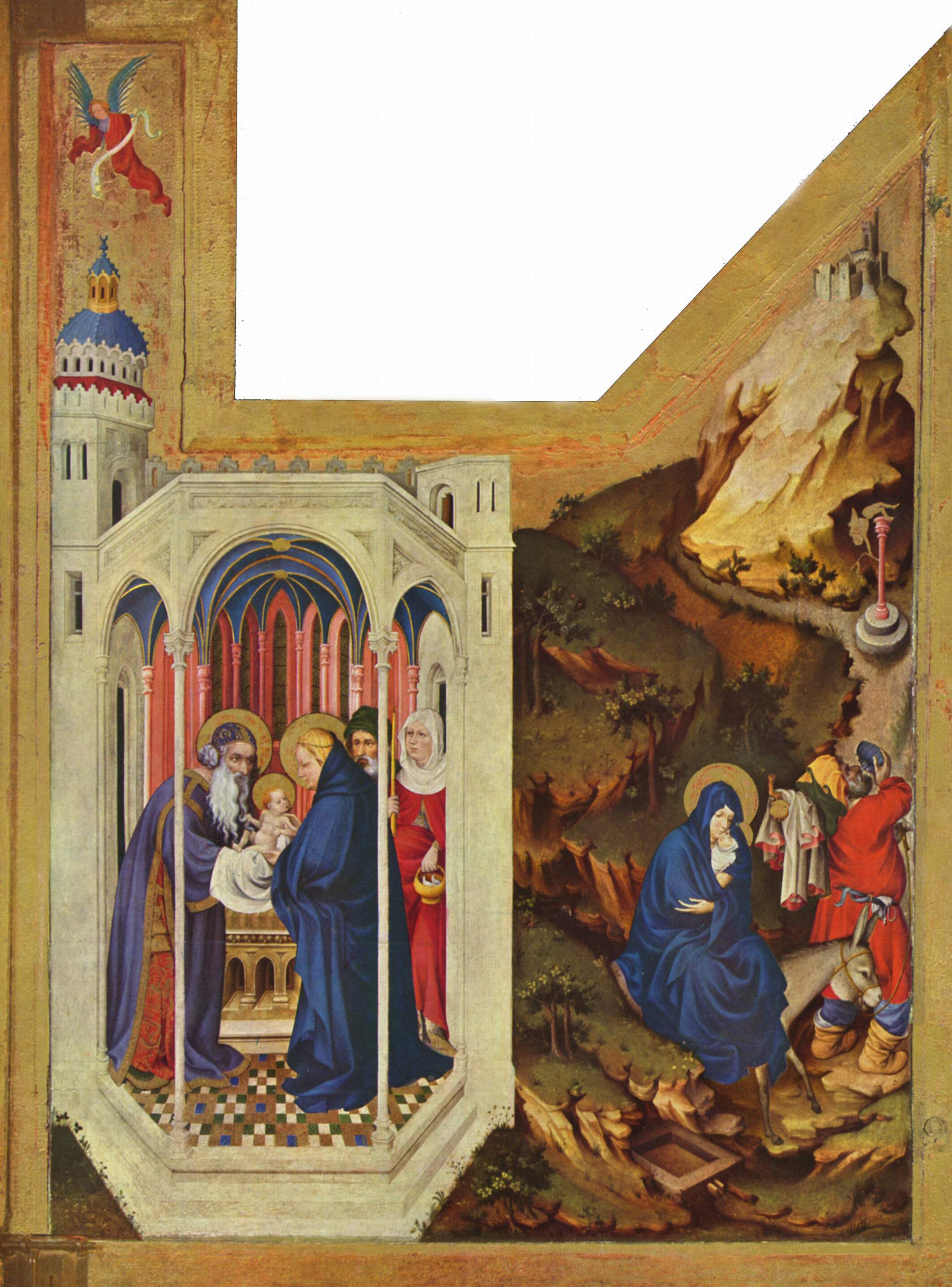
Presentation at the Temple and Flight, with legends of the idol and spring, Melchior Broederlam, Burgundy, c. 1400

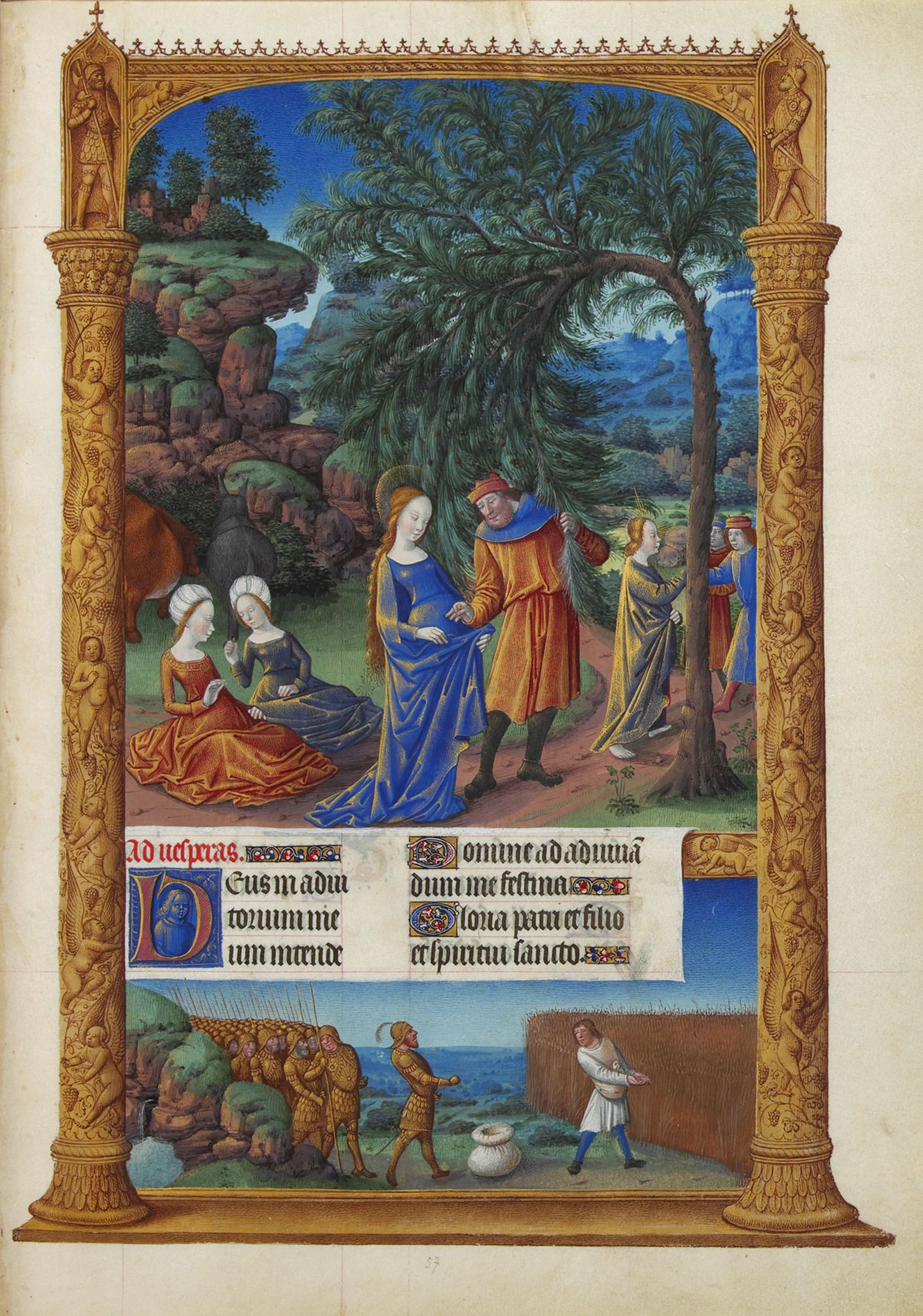
The miracles of the palm tree and corn on the Flight, from a book of hours, c. 1400

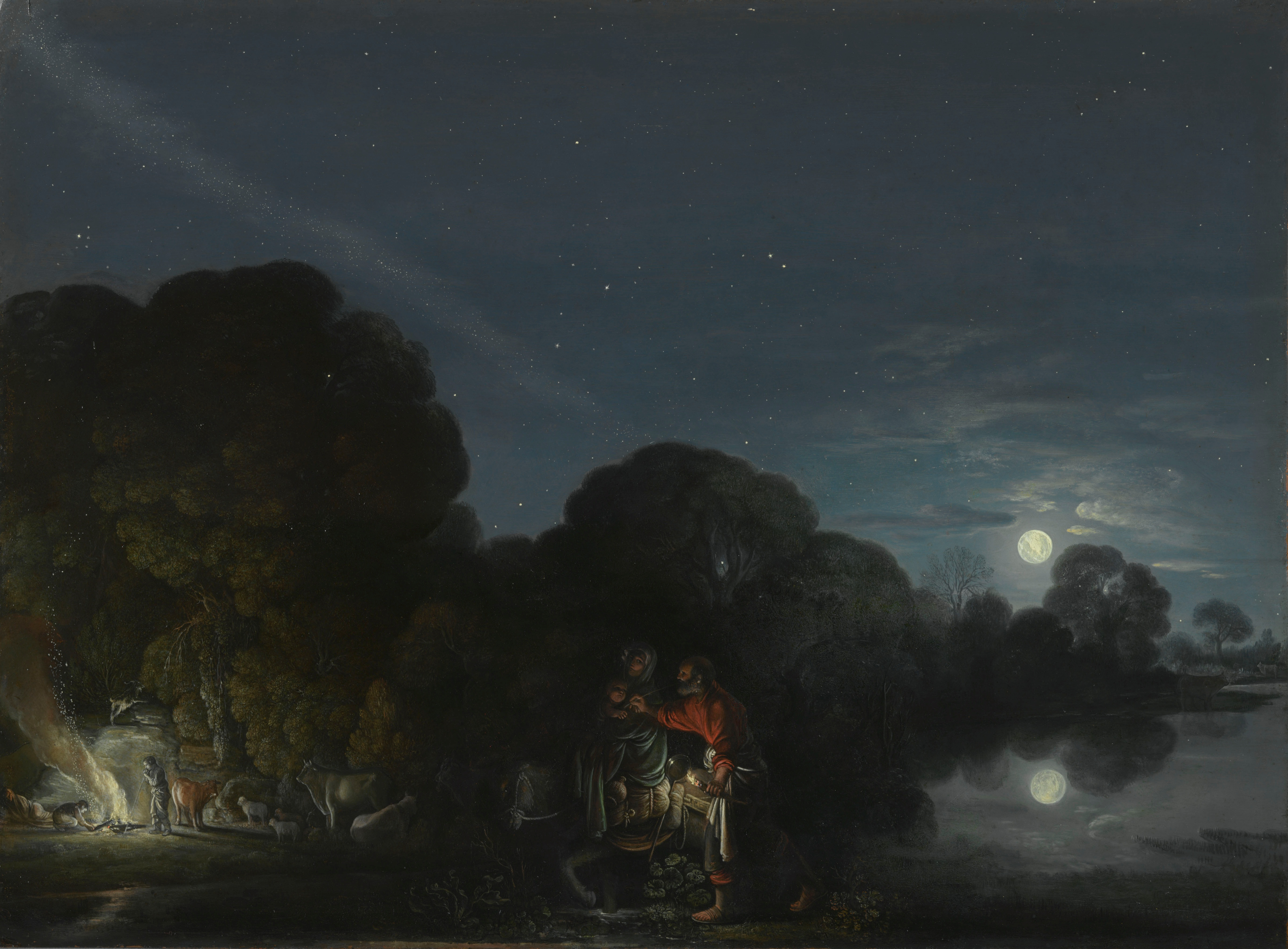
The Flight into Egypt, Adam Elsheimer, c. 1605, as a night scene

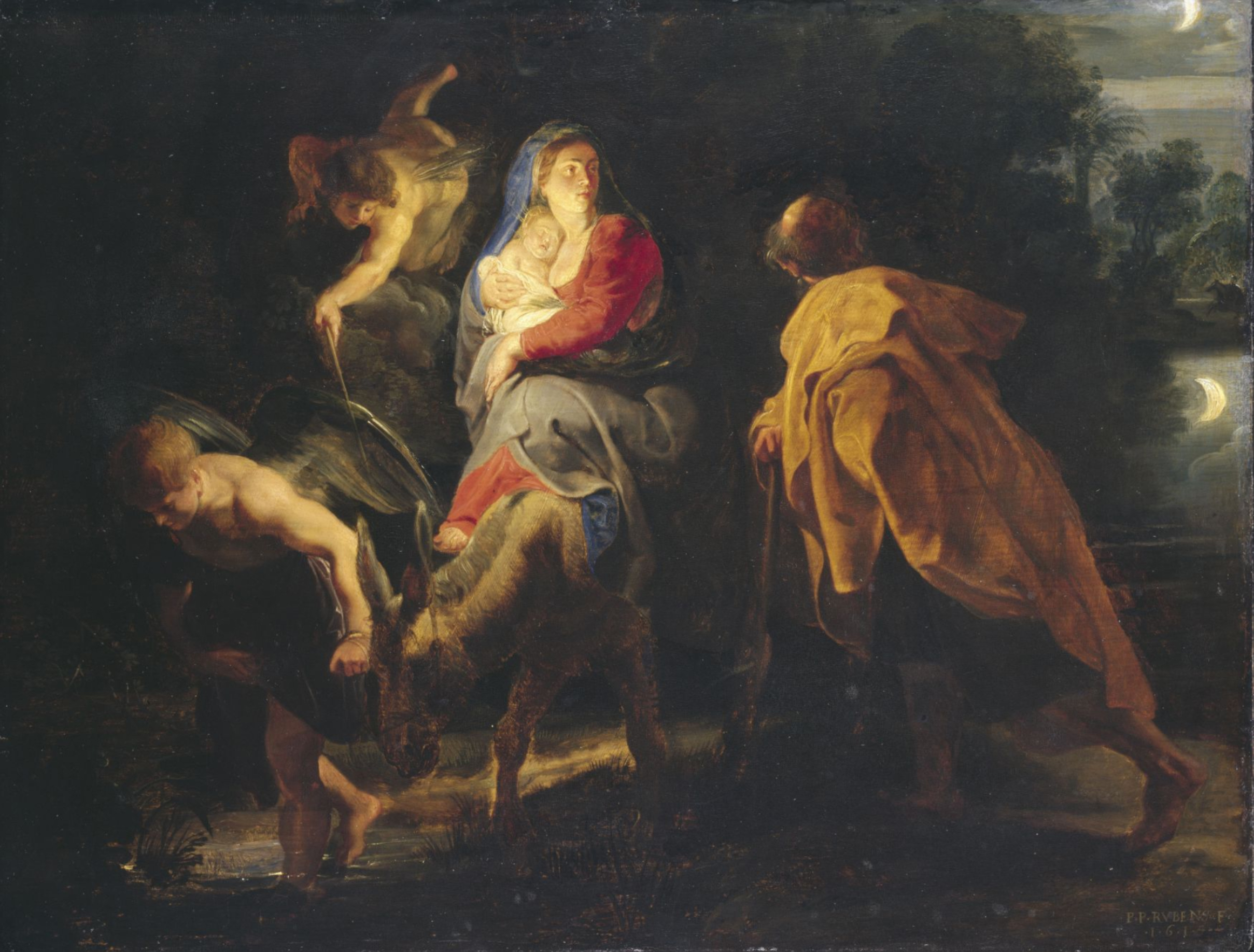
Rubens, 1614

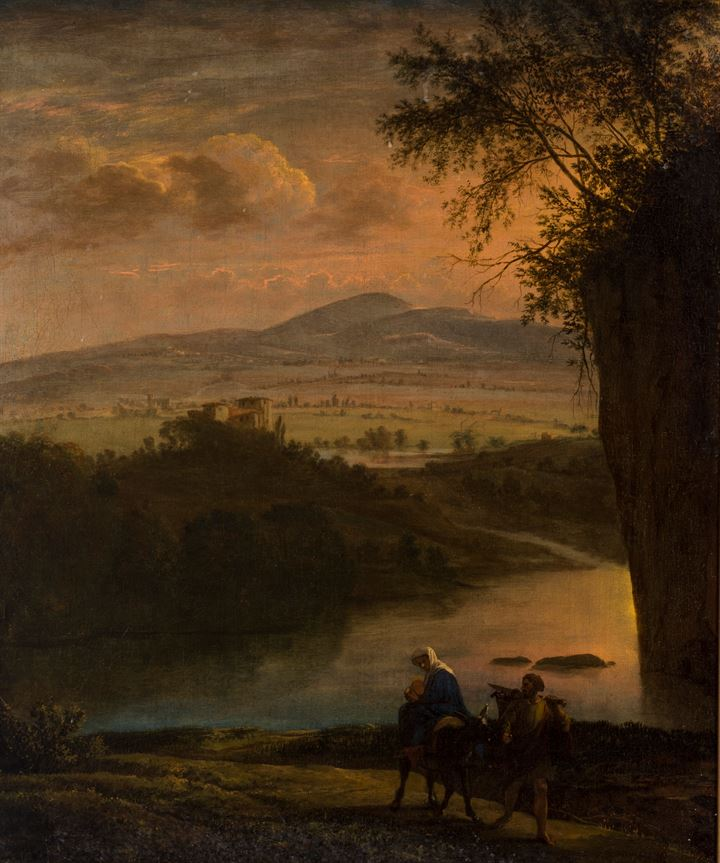
Jan Asselyn, c. 1640

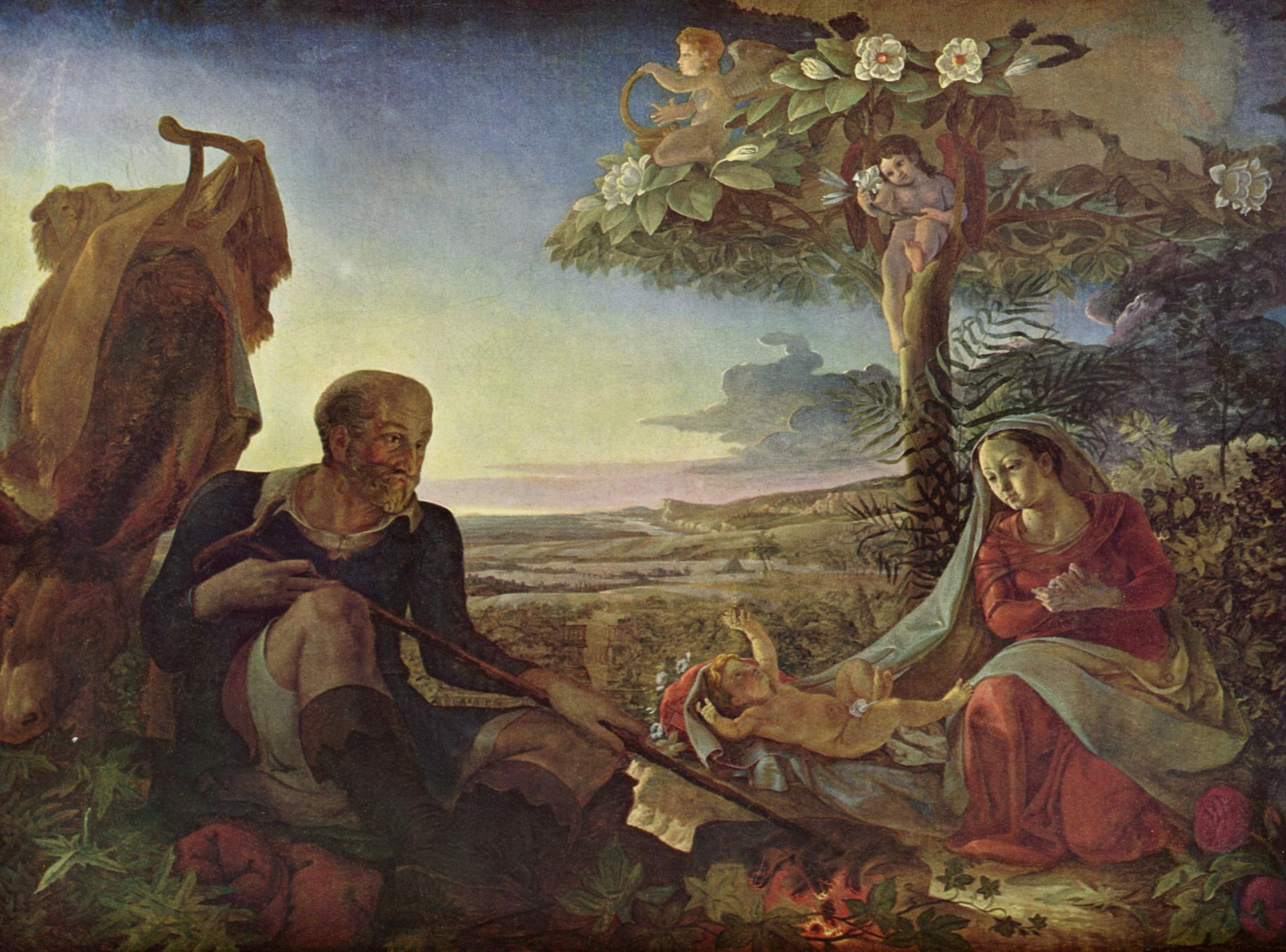
Romantic Rest on the Flight by Philipp Otto Runge, 1806

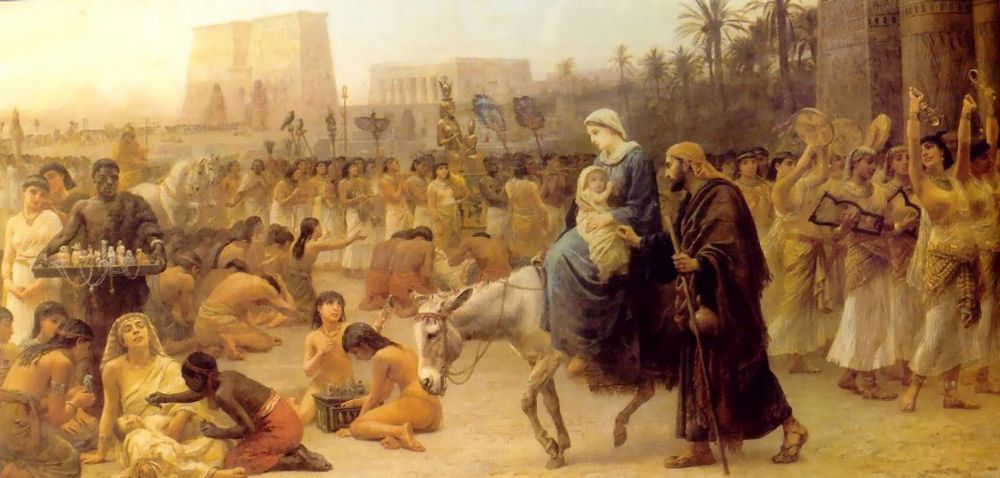
British Orientalist artist Edwin Long, Anno Domini, 1883, shows the arrival in Egypt; the idols seem intact.

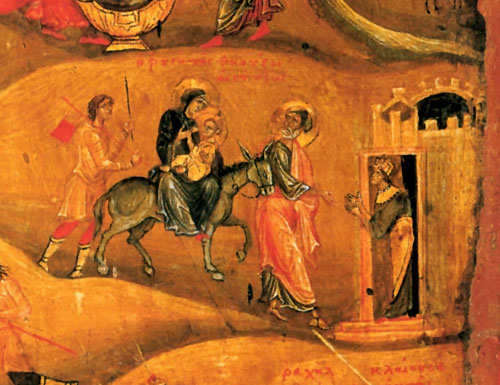
Saint Catherine's Monastery, 12th century

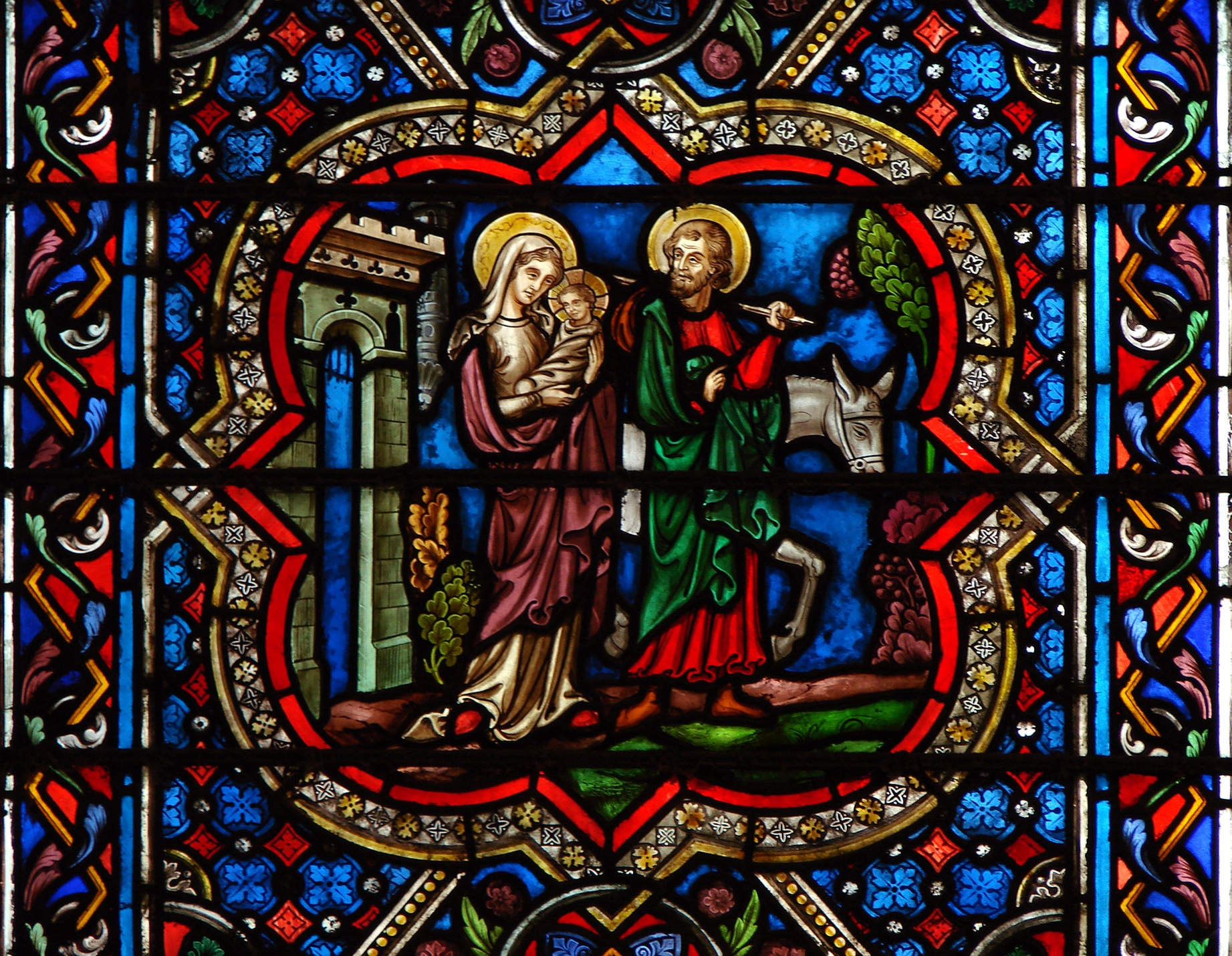
The Flight into Egypt, stained glass in a choir chapel, Notre Dame de Paris cathedral, Paris, France

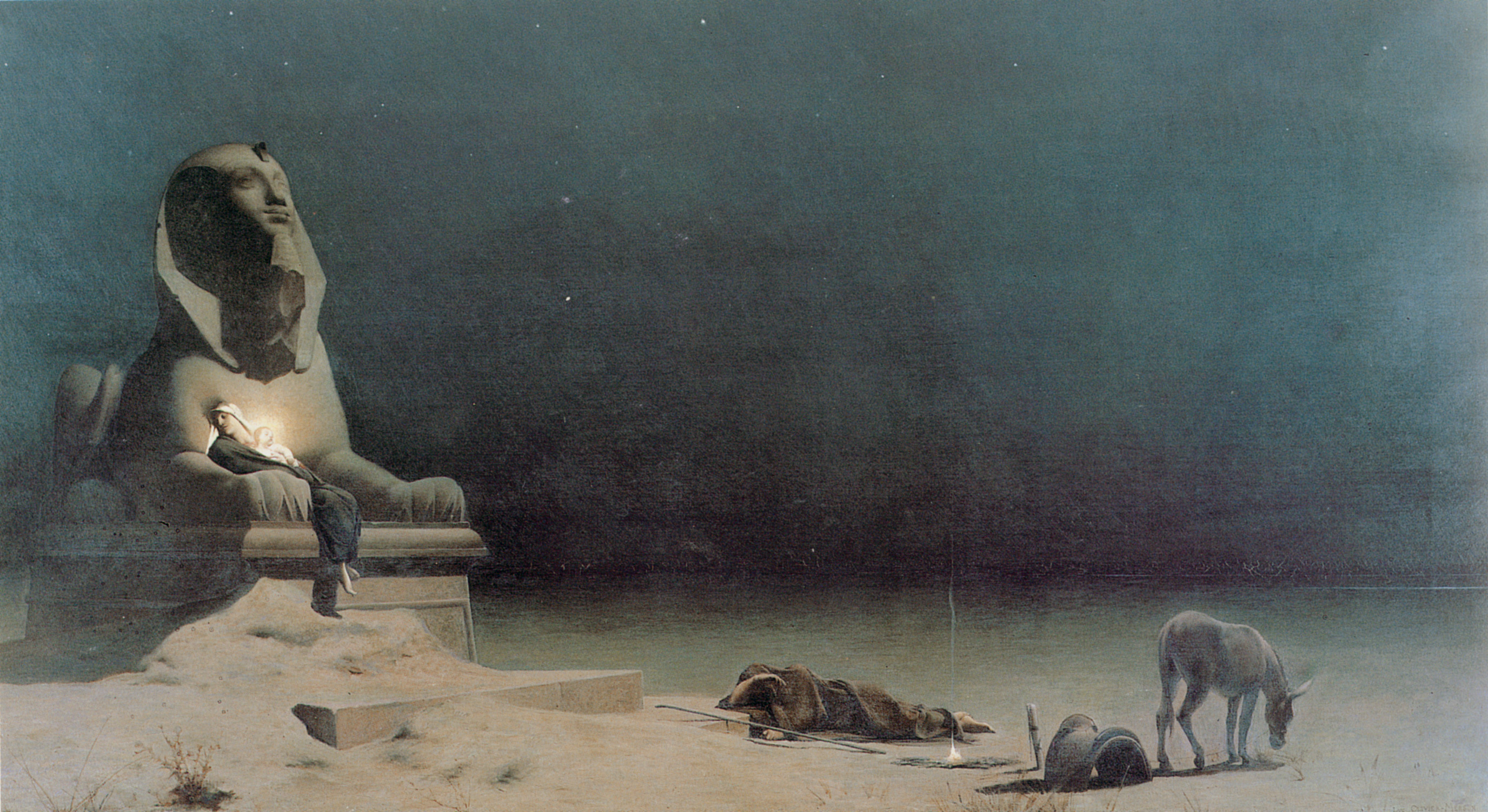
Rest on the Flight into Egypt by Luc-Olivier Merson, 1879, Museum of Fine Arts, Boston

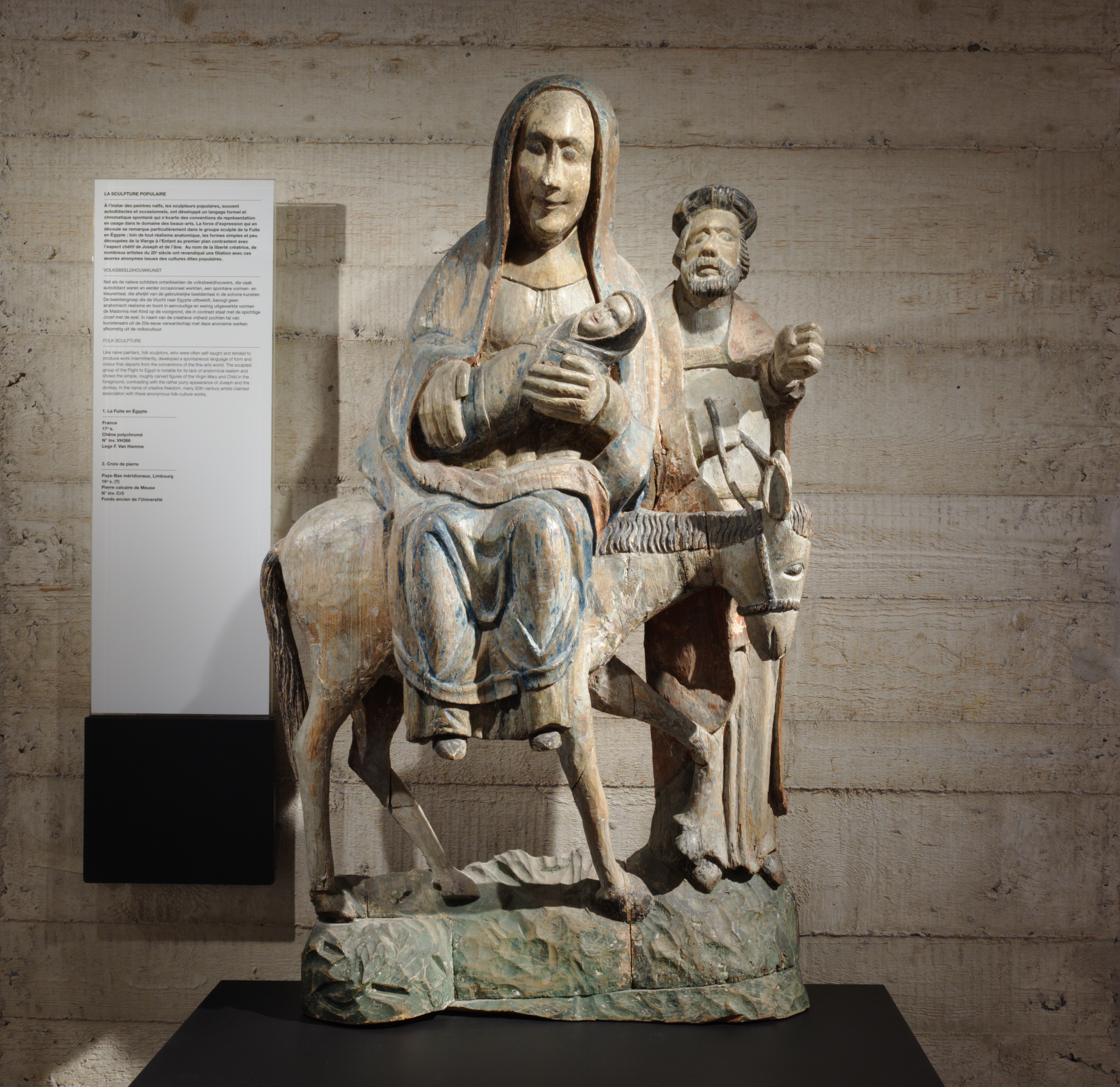
French 17th century painted wood

== Nazarenes, Nazareth, and Nazirites ==
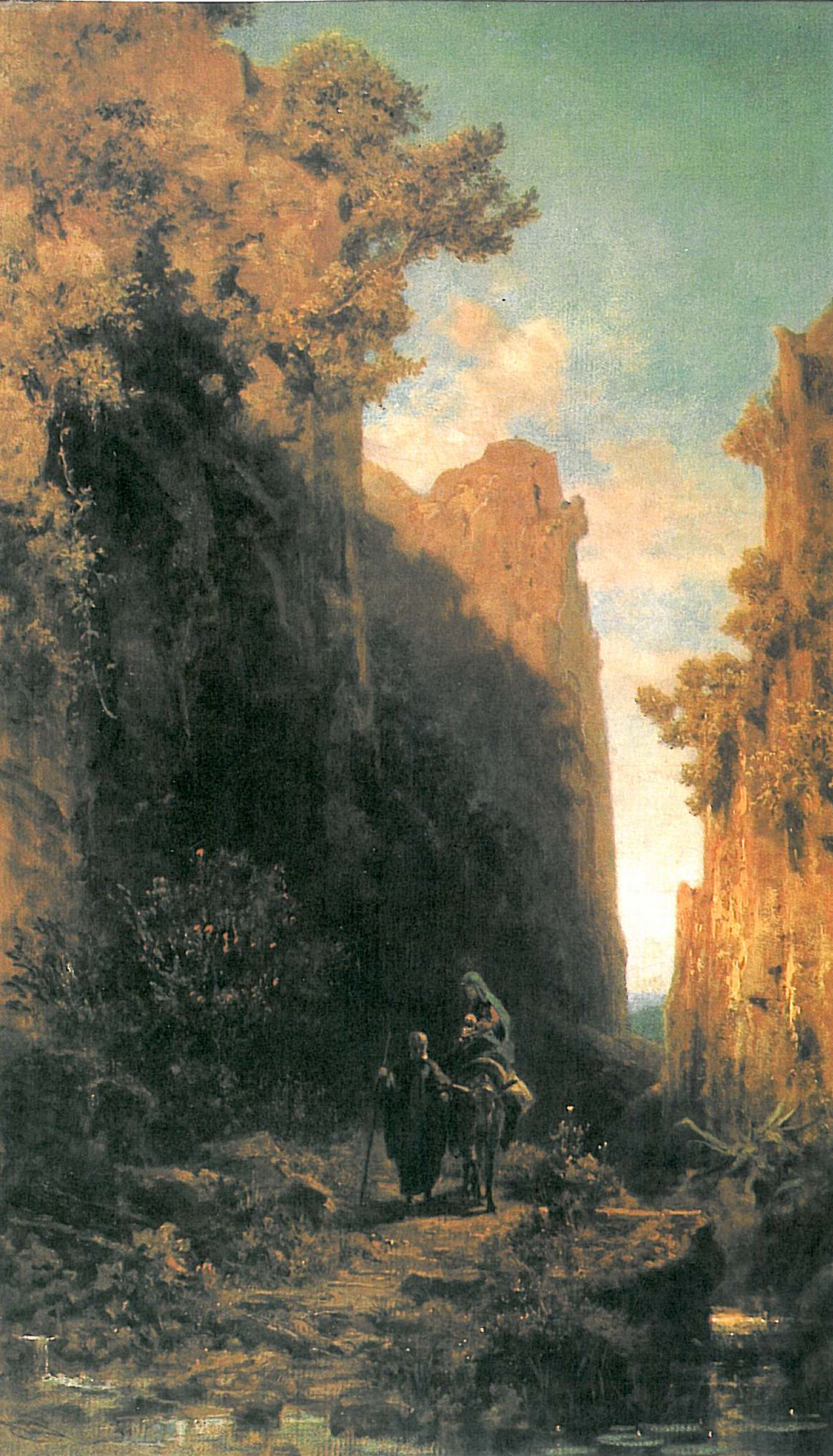
Die Flucht nach Ägypten by Carl Spitzweg, 1875–1879

While Luke places Jesus' family as being originally from the town of Nazareth, Matthew has the family moving there, fearing Archelaus who was ruling in Judea in place of his father Herod. Nazareth, now a town, is not mentioned by the Old Testament, Josephus or rabbinical sources, though many Christian Bible archaeologists, such as the evangelical and egyptologist Kenneth Kitchen, state that they are fairly sure that a village existed in the area at the time of Jesus. Clarke notes that the location of Nazareth is just to the north of where the large town Sepphoris was located. At the time, Sepphoris had been largely destroyed in the violence following the death of Herod the Great, and was being rebuilt by Herod Antipas, hence Clarke speculates that this could have been seen as a good source of employment by Joseph, a carpenter. Ehrman countered that Sepphoris is never even mentioned in the New Testament; the adult Jesus and his followers (all uneducated, Aramaic-speaking fishermen and shepherds from the countryside) only visit villages in Galilee, preferably villages that were receptive to Jesus' ministry, while in the woes to the unrepentant cities, Jesus condemns all cities that rejected him (again not mentioning Sepphoris).

The difficulty with the brief quote he will be called a Nazarene is that it occurs nowhere in the Old Testament, or any other extant source. The most similar known passage is Judges 13:5 where of Samson it says the child shall be a Nazirite, where a nazirite was a specific type of religious ascetic. That the Nazirite and Nazareth are so similar in name, while Nazareth isn't mentioned in any other source until after the Gospels have been written, and that the passage almost parallels one about the birth of a hero who was a Nazirite, has led many to propose that Matthew originally had Jesus being a Nazirite, but it was changed to Nazarene, inventing a location named Nazareth, when the ascetic requirements fell foul of later religious practices. Biblical scholar R. T. France rejects this explanation, stating that Jesus was not a Nazirite and claiming that he is never described as one.

Another theory is that it is based on a prophecy at Isaiah 11:1, which states there shall come forth a rod out of the stem of Jesse, and a Branch shall grow out of his roots: — the Hebrew for branch is נצר (netzer). The priestly clan of the "netzerites" possibly settled in the place which became known as Netzereth/ Nazareth. Bargil Pixner in his work "With Jesus Through Galilee" says that the title Nazarene, given to Jesus, alludes not so much to his town of origin as to his royal descent. While this piece of wordplay is meaningless when translated into Greek, Hebrew wordplay is not unknown in Matthew, underlining the opinion that some parts of this gospel were originally written in Hebrew.

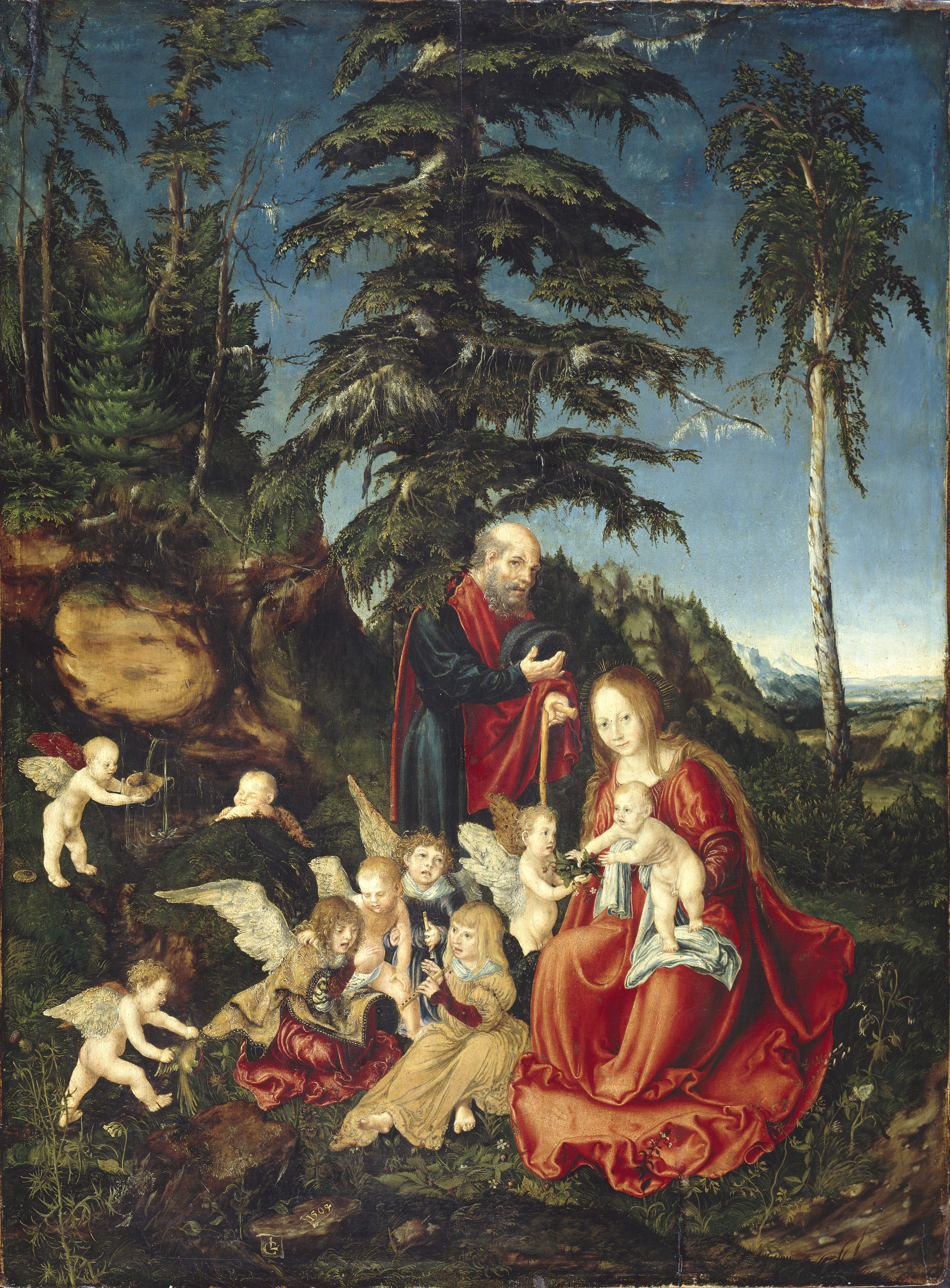
Rest on the Flight into Egypt by Lucas Cranach the Elder (1504)

== Christian traditions associated with the Flight into Egypt ==
The Flight into Egypt is one of the listed Seven Sorrows of Mary.

A local French tradition states that Saint Aphrodisius, an Egyptian saint who was venerated as the first bishop of Béziers, was the man who sheltered the Holy Family when they fled into Egypt.

In Coptic Christianity, it is also held that the Holy family visited many areas in Egypt, including Musturud (where there is now the Church of the Virgin Mary), Wadi El Natrun (which has four large monasteries), and Old Cairo, along with Farama, Tel Basta, Samanoud, Bilbais, Samalout, Maadi, Al-Maṭariyyah, Arganus and Asiut among others. It is likewise tradition that the Holy Family visited Coptic Cairo and stayed at the site of Saints Sergius and Bacchus Church (Abu Serga) and the place where the Church of the Holy Virgin (Babylon El-Darag) stands now. At Al-Maṭariyyah, then in Heliopolis and now part of Cairo, there is a sycamore tree (and adjacent chapel) that is a 1672 planting replacing an earlier tree under which Mary was said to have rested, or in some versions hidden from pursuers in the hollow trunk, while pious spiders covered the entrance with dense webs.

== Commentary ==
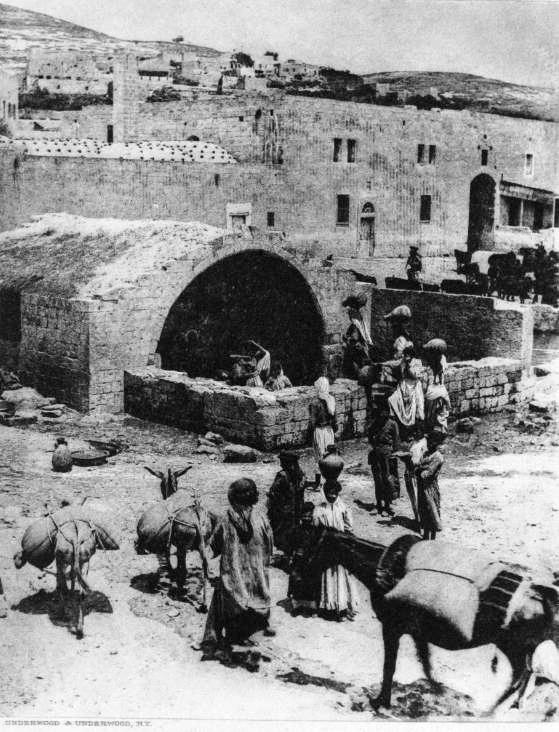
Fountain in Nazareth, reputed to have been used by the Holy Family, photo 1917

Cornelius a Lapide, commenting on the flight into Egypt wrote that, "tropologically, Christ fled into Egypt that He might teach us to despise exile, and that we, as pilgrims and exiles on the earth, might pant after and strive for heaven as our true country. Whence Peter Chrysologus says (Serm. 115), "Christ fled that He might make it more tolerable for us, when we have to flee in persecution." S. Gregory Nazian. (Orat. 28) says—"Every land, and no land is my country." No land was Gregory's country, because heaven was his country. Again, every land was his country, because he looked upon the whole world as his country. Thus Socrates, when he was asked what countryman he was, replied, "A citizen of the world."

Justus Knecht notes that the flight shows The Omniscience of God, writing, "God knew that in the morning Herod would send soldiers to Bethlehem, to slay the little boys under two years old; therefore He ordered St. Joseph to flee in the middle of the night. The Lord God knew also the moment of Herod's death, as well as the evil disposition of his son and successor, Archelaus. He therefore warned St. Joseph not to return to Judaea, but to take up his abode at Nazareth in Galilee."

Roger Baxter reflects on the flight in his Meditations writing, "How different are the thoughts of God from the thoughts of men! Christ was no sooner born, than sent into banishment. The Almighty could easily have rid the world of Herod, or have appeased his anger, or have rendered His divine Son invisible; but He adopted the ordinary means of safety, and His Son must fly. Reflect how derogatory this was to the dignity of the Redeemer, and how full of inconveniences. Thus God always treats those whom He loves best. Are you greater or better than the Son of God? Why, then, do you complain when His providence prepares crosses for you?"

== See also ==
- Chapel of the Milk Grotto
- Exsul Familia
- L'enfance du Christ
- Rest on the Flight into Egypt (Caravaggio)
- Biblical Egypt

Flight into Egypt Life of Jesus
Preceded by Visit of the Wise Men	New Testament; Events	Succeeded by Massacre of the Innocents
