= Matthew 2:14 =

- ← 2:13 2:15 →
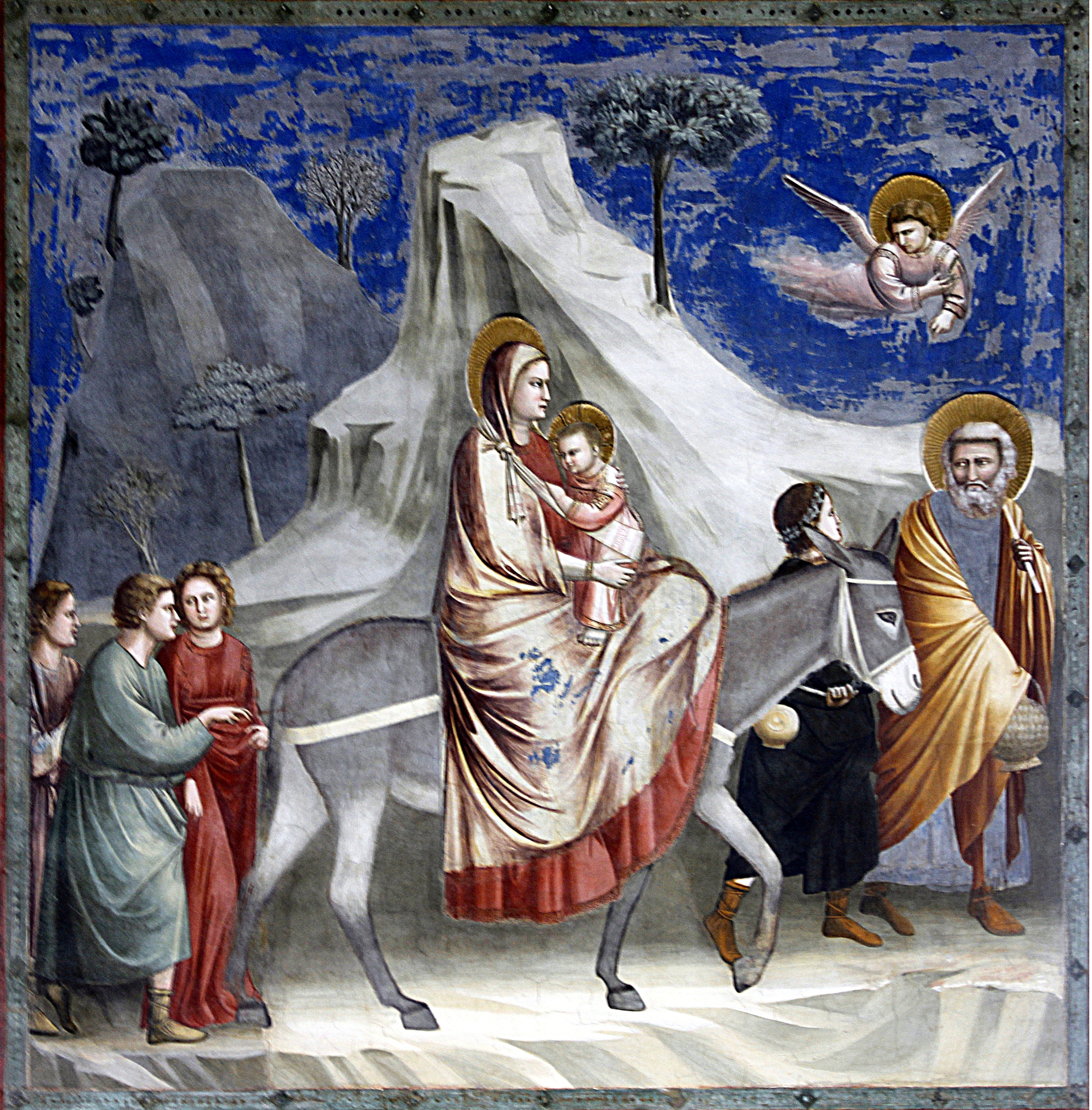
- Giotto di Bondone's The Flight into Egypt
- Book: Gospel of Matthew
- Christian Bible part: New Testament

Matthew 2:14 is the fourteenth verse of the second chapter of the Gospel of Matthew in the New Testament. Joseph has been warned in a dream that he must flee to Egypt to escape the wrath of King Herod. An event known as the Flight into Egypt.

== Content ==
In the King James Version of the Bible the text reads:

When he arose, he took the
young child and his mother by
night, and departed into Egypt:

The World English Bible translates the passage as:

He arose and took the young
child and his mother by night,
and departed into Egypt,

The Novum Testamentum Graece text is:

ὁ δὲ ἐγερθεὶς παρέλαβεν τὸ παιδίον
καὶ τὴν μητέρα αὐτοῦ νυκτὸς
καὶ ἀνεχώρησεν εἰς Αἴγυπτον,

For a collection of other versions see BibleHub Matthew 2:14

== Analysis ==
As with Matthew 1:24 Joseph's obedience to his dream is immediate and unquestioning. Rapid obedience to God is an important virtue throughout the Gospel of Matthew. The family leaves at night, which was an unusual and dangerous time to travel in that era. This quick departure highlights Joseph's rapid obedience, and also the immediacy of the threat. Matthew again is careful not to describe Joseph as the father of Jesus, only the husband of his mother.

That the Gospel of Luke does not mention this sojourn at all and rather has Jesus in the town of Nazareth within days of his birth. This has inspired a number of attempts to reconcile the two gospels. At the time Egypt controlled Gaza, only a few miles from Bethlehem. Some evangelicals thus feel that the family merely made this brief, and unremarkable journey, and did not go to Egypt itself. However at the time Egypt generally referred to the Nile Valley and most readers would have interpreted the term much the same way modern readers would. If the author of Matthew was referring to Gaza he was creating something of a false impression. Bethlehem to the Nile Valley is about 150 miles, and the journey would have taken at least a week.

The Flight into Egypt is a well known part of the Biblical story, and it is one very frequently depicted in works of art. However this brief verse is the only information the canon scriptures give to this voyage. Most of the traditions about this voyage come from the New Testament Apocrypha. These later works have a number of miraculous stories occurring on the voyage with palm trees bowing before the Infant Jesus and the beasts of the desert paying him homage. An encounter with the two thieves that would later be crucified alongside Jesus is also reported. In these tales the holy family are joined by Jesus' nurse Salome. The story of the palm trees makes it into the Qur'an with Sura 19:24 relating the event.

Why Matthew includes this trip to Egypt has also been debated by scholars. Stendhal's interpretation of Matthew 2 is that it is a lengthy apology for why the messiah left Bethlehem, a town of great religious importance, for the minor and little known Nazareth in Gentile Galilee. However, the side trip to Egypt does little to advance this argument. One view is that Matthew is presenting Jesus as Moses, but in reverse, to draw parallels with that other great Jewish leader. France feels that the trip to Egypt is part of Matthew's greater interest in geography. France notes that in Matthew 4:24-25 the entire Holy Land is described as being aware of Jesus, while the arrival of the magi "from the east" in Matthew 2:1 is a reference to Mesopotamia. This leaves out only one major portion of the Jewish world: Egypt. France feels that this brief trip was added to cover this omission.

== Commentary from the Church Fathers ==
Pseudo-Chrysostom: He says not, ‘the Mother and her young Child,’ but, the young Child and His mother; for the Child was not born for the mother, but the mother prepared for the Child. How is this that the Son of God flies from the face of man? or who shall deliver from the enemy's hand, if He Himself fears His enemies? First; He ought to observe, even in this, the law of that human nature which He took on Him; and human nature and infancy must flee before threatening power. Next, that Christians when persecution makes it necessary should not be ashamed to fly. But why into Egypt? The Lord, who keepeth not His anger forever, remembered the woes He had brought upon Egypt, and therefore sent His Son thither, and gives it this sign of great reconciliation, that with this one remedy He might heal the ten plagues of Egypt, and the nation that had been the persecutor of this first-born people, might be the guardian of His first-born Son. As formerly they had cruelly tyrannized, now they might devoutly serve; nor go to the Red Sea to be drowned, but be called to the waters of baptism to receive life.

Augustine: Hear the sacrament of a great mystery. Moses before had shut up the light of day from the traitors the Egyptians; Christ by going down thither brought back light to them that sate in darkness. He fled that he might enlighten them, not that he might escape his foes.

Augustine: The miserable tyrant supposed that by the Saviour's coming he should be thrust from his royal throne. But it was not so; Christ came not to hurt others’ dignity, but to bestow His own on others.

Hilary of Poitiers: Egypt full of idols; for after this enquiry for Him among the Jews, Christ leaving Judæa goes to be cherished among nations given to the vainest superstitions.

Jerome: When he takes the Child and His mother to go into Egypt, it is in the night and darkness, when to return into Judæa, the Gospel speaks of no light, no darkness.

Pseudo-Chrysostom: The straitness of every persecution may be called night—the relief from it in like manner, day.

Rabanus Maurus: For when the true light withdraws, they who hate the light are in darkness, when it returns they are again enlightened.

Chrysostom: See how immediately on His birth the tyrant is furious against Him, and the mother with her Child is driven into foreign lands. So should you in the beginning of your spiritual career seem to have tribulation, you need not to be discouraged, but bear all things manfully, having this example.

Bede: The flight into Egypt signifies that the elect are often by the wickedness of the bad driven from their homes, or sentenced to banishment. Thus He, who, we shall see below, gave the command to His own, When they shall persecute you in one city, flee ye to another, first practised what He enjoined, as a man flying before the face of man on earth. He whom but a little before a star had proclaimed to the Magi to be worshipped as from heaven.

Saint Remigius: Isaiah had foretold this flight into Egypt. Lo! the Lord shall ascend on a light cloud, and shall come into Egypt, and shall scatter the idols of Egypt. (Is. 19:1.) It is the practice of this Evangelist to confirm all he says; and that because he is writing to the Jews, therefore he adds, that it might be fulfilled, &c.

== Bibliography ==
- Albright, W.F. and C.S. Mann. "Matthew." The Anchor Bible Series. New York: Doubleday & Company, 1971.
- Brown, Raymond E. The Birth of the Messiah: A Commentary on the Infancy Narratives in Matthew and Luke. London: G. Chapman, 1977.

Preceded by Matthew 2:13	Gospel of Matthew; Chapter 2	Succeeded by Matthew 2:15
