= Matthew 2:15 =

- ← 2:14 2:16 →
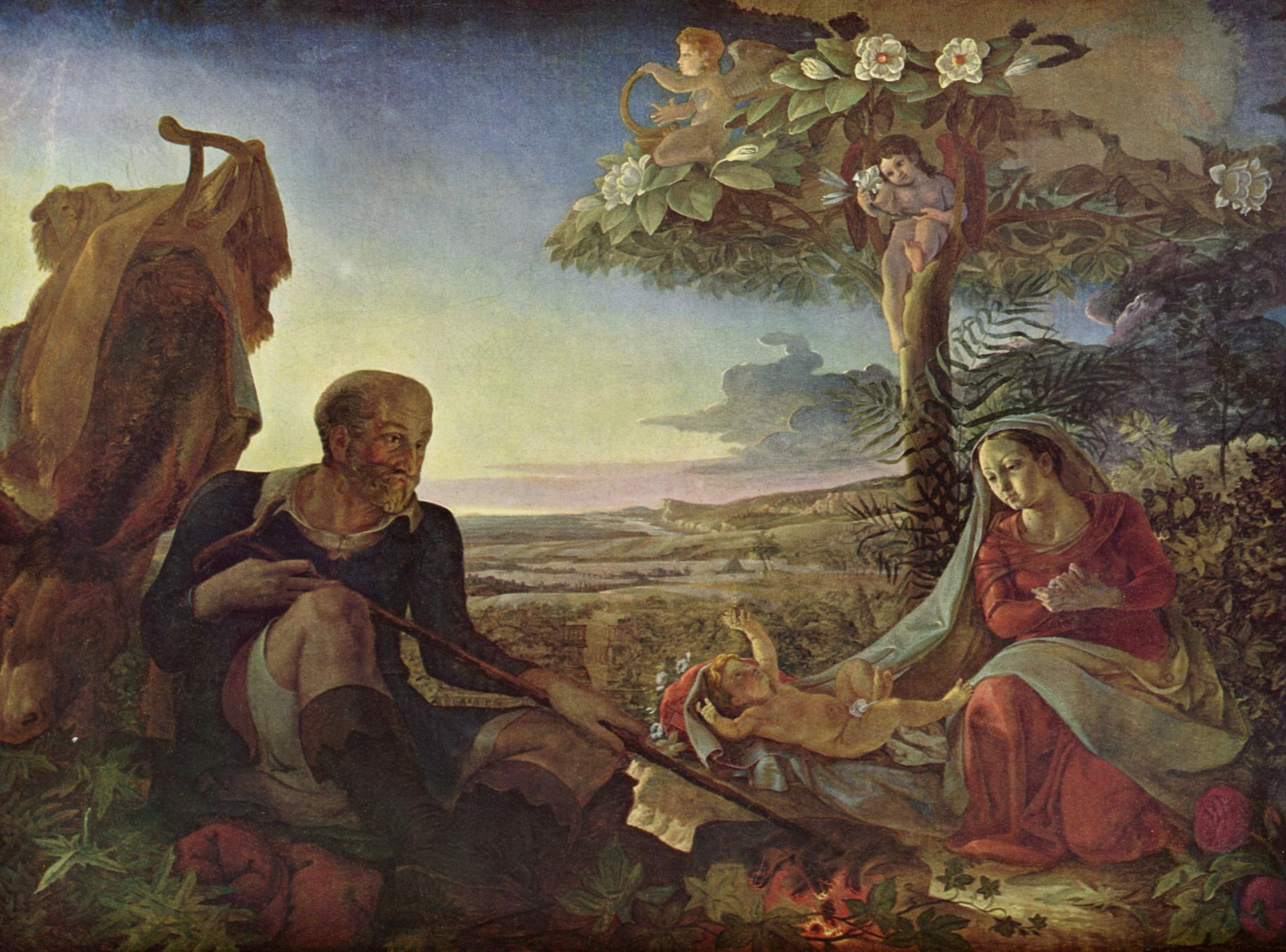
- Rest on the Flight into Egypt by Philipp Otto Runge, 1806
- Book: Gospel of Matthew
- Christian Bible part: New Testament

Matthew 2:15 is the fifteenth verse of the second chapter of the Gospel of Matthew in the New Testament. In the verse, Joseph has taken Jesus and his family to Egypt to flee the wrath of King Herod.

== Content ==
In the King James Version of the Bible the text reads:

And was there until the death
of Herod: that it might be
fulfilled which was spoken of
the Lord by the prophet, saying,
Out of Egypt have I called my son.

The World English Bible translates the passage as:

and was there until the death of
Herod; that it might be fulfilled
which was spoken by the Lord
through the prophet, saying,
"Out of Egypt I called my son."

The Novum Testamentum Graece text is:

καὶ ἦν ἐκεῖ ἕως τῆς τελευτῆς Ἡρῴδου
ἵνα πληρωθῇ τὸ ῥηθὲν ὑπὸ Κυρίου
διὰ τοῦ προφήτου λέγοντος
Ἐξ Αἰγύπτου ἐκάλεσα τὸν υἱόν μου.

For a collection of other versions see BibleHub Matthew 2:15

== Analysis ==
Herod is believed to have died in March of 4 BC. The Gospel gives little detail about the Holy Family's time in Egypt, but there are a number of apocryphal tales filling in this period. These stories of the time in Egypt have been especially important to the Coptic Church, which is based in that country. Throughout Egypt there are a number of churches and shrines that claim to mark an area where the Holy Family stayed. The most important of these is the church of Abu Serghis that claims to be built on the place the family had its home.

This verse contains Matthew's third direct quote from the Old Testament. This brief line is from Hosea 11:1, referring to God's call to Israel as his firstborn son (cf. Exodus 4:22) 'out of Egypt at the time of Exodus'. Matthew's emphasis here is 'the truth that Jesus is the embodiment and fulfillment of the mission and identity of Israel', because 'everything that God called Israel to be, Jesus is'. Long observes the faint outlines of a prominent theological theme in Matthew, that is, 'the hidden hand of God ruling human history'; whereas the course of human affairs seems to be at random, beneath the surface is the 'narrative of grace and redemption, firmly written by the hidden hand of God'.

== Commentary from the Church Fathers ==
Jerome: This is not in the LXX (Septuagint); but in Osee according to the genuine Hebrew text we read; Israel is my child, and I have loved him, and, from Egypt have I called my Son; where the LXX (Septuagint) render, Israel is my child, and I have loved him, and called my sons out of Egypt.

Jerome: (In Osee 11:2.) The Evangelist cites this text, because it refers to Christ typically. For it is to be observed, that in this Prophet and in others, the coming of Christ and the call of the Gentiles are foreshown in such a manner, that the thread of history is never broken.

Chrysostom: It is a law of prophecy, that in a thousand places many things are said of some and fulfilled of others. As it is said of Simeon and Levi, I will divide them in Jacob, and scatter them in Israel; (Gen. 49:7.) which was fulfilled not in themselves, but in their descendants. So here Christ is by nature the Son of God, and so the prophecy is fulfilled in Him.

Jerome: Let those who deny the authenticity of the Hebrew copies, show us this passage in the LXX (Septuagint), and when they have failed to find it, we will show it them in the Hebrew. We may also explain it in another way, by considering it as quoted from Numbers, God brought him out of Egypt; his glory is as it were that of a unicorn. (Num. 23:22.)

Saint Remigius: In Joseph is figured the order of preachers, in Mary Holy Scripture; by the Child the knowledge of the Saviour; by the cruelty of Herod the persecution which the Church suffered in Jerusalem; by Joseph's flight into Egypt the passing of the preachers to the unbelieving Gentiles, (for Egypt signifies darkness;) by the time that he abode in Egypt the space of time between the ascension of the Lord and the coming of Anti Christ; by Herod's death the extinction of jealousy in the hearts of the Jews.

== See also ==
- Christ the Lord: Out of Egypt: a 2005 book by Anne Rice

== Sources ==
- Bruce, F.F. (2014). Matthew. Vol. 1. BookBaby. ISBN 9781909680296.
- Long, Thomas G. (1997). Matthew. Westminster Bible companion. Westminster John Knox Press. ISBN 9780664252571.

Preceded by Matthew 2:14	Gospel of Matthew; Chapter 2	Succeeded by Matthew 2:16
