= Kimberly Bracken Long =

Kimberly Bracken Long is currently the editor of Call to Worship: Liturgy, Music, Preaching, and the Arts, the liturgy journal for the Presbyterian Church (U.S.A.). She is also the pastor of two small United Methodist churches: Antioch United Methodist Church and Spedden United Methodist Church. She was ordained as a minister of the Presbyterian Church (U.S.A.) and a professor of sacramental and liturgical worship in the tradition of the reformed church at Columbia Theological Seminary. Her work has been influential in turning greater attention towards the meaning and place of sacraments and liturgical language in worship. Her most recent work focuses on the theology and history of marriage, with a particular emphasis on inclusive marriage liturgy. She is married to professor of preaching Thomas G. Long.

== Career ==
Long received a B.Mus. from the College of Wooster (1981), a M.Mus. from the University of Maryland (1985), a M.Div. from Princeton Theological Seminary (1990), and a Ph.D. from Drew University (2005). She was ordained in the Presbyterian Church (U.S.A.) as she completed her M.Div. (1990) and began working in parish ministry. She served as a temporary supply pastor for Calvary Presbyterian Church in Wyncote, PA (1990–1992) and then as the pastor for First Presbyterian Church in Bordentown, NJ (1992–2000). Following this she chose to pursue an academic career in teaching. She began as an Adjunct Instructor in worship at Candler School of Theology (2002–2003), but then moved to Columbia Theological Seminary. Here she served as Adjunct Instructor for Worship and Preaching (2003–2005), an Adjunct Assistant Professor of Worship and Ministry (2005–2006), Assistant Professor of Worship and Coordinator of Worship Resources for Congregations (2007–2011), and the Assistant Professor of Worship (2011–2013). She also spent as brief time as the Associate for Worship in the Office of Theology and Worship for the Presbyterian Church (U.S.A.) (2006–2007). Long currently still serves as Columbia Theological Seminary as the Associate Professor of Worship.

== Thought ==
Long strives to help church leaders give serious thought to how they lead worship and the theological meanings behind their actions and language. In one of her most popular publications, The Worshiping Body: The Art of Leading Worship, she desires that others understand how full of symbols worship is, including the presider as one of them. Long argues the goal of these symbols should be to evoke the worship of the people rather than to call attention to themselves. Her particular focus is upon the importance of the sacraments of baptism and communion.

Long's current work seeks to understand marriage in the church and to create worship resources for marriage that is inclusive of all people. It has been very influential in the Presbyterian Church (U.S.A.), as well as the wider religious community. She has written a great deal of research on the relationship between marriage and the church and the shape it takes in today's society. She argues that marriage rites should not be exclusive and that convinced that if the church is going to stay in the marriage business then it needs to find a way to do it more authentically and with more integrity.

== Works ==
- The Worshiping Body: The Art of Leading Worship (Louisville: Westminster/John Knox, 2009).
- The Eucharistic Theology of the American Holy Fairs (Westminster/John Knox, 2011).
- Inclusive Marriage Services: A Wedding Sourcebook, ed. with David Maxwell (Louisville: Westminster John Knox Press, 2015).
- Co-Editor, Book of Common Worship, 2nd edition, forthcoming in 2018.
- Editor, Call to Worship: Liturgy, Music, Preaching and the Arts (2005-2011).
- Peer reviewer in religious studies, Journal of Interdisciplinary Studies (2006–2007).
- From This Day Forward—Rethinking the Christian Wedding, forthcoming from Westminster John Knox Press, 2016.
- Feasting on the Word Worship Companion, Year B, Vol. 2, Trinity through Reign of Christ, ed., (Louisville: Westminster/John Knox, 2015).
- "The Psalms in Christian Worship," in Oxford Handbook of the Psalms, ed. William P. Brown, (New York: Oxford University Press, 2014), 545–556.
- Feasting on the Word Worship Companion, Year B, Vol. 1, Advent through Pentecost, ed., (Westminster/John Knox., 2014).
- Feasting on the Word Worship Companion, Year A, Vol. 2, Trinity through Reign of Christ, ed. (Westminster/John Knox, 2014).
- Feasting on the Word Worship Companion, Year A, Part 1, Advent through Pentecost, ed. (Westminster / John Knox, 2013).
- Feasting on the Word Worship Companion, Year C, Part 2, Trinity through Reign of Christ, ed. (Westminster / John Knox, 2013).
- Feasting on the Word Worship Companion, Year C, Part 1, Advent through Pentecost, ed.(Westminster/John Knox, 2012).
- Homiletical essays (3) on the psalms for Easter Vigil, Easter Day, and Second Sunday of Easter in Feasting on the Word: Lectionary Commentary Series, Year A, Vol. 2 (Louisville: Westminster/John Knox, 2010), 335–339, 359–363, 383–387.
- Pastoral essays (3) on the gospel for Propers 22, 23, and 24 in Feasting on the Word: Lectionary Commentary Series, Year C, Vol. 4 (Louisville: Westminster/ John Knox, 2010). 140–144, 164–168, 188–192.
- Homiletical essays (3) on the gospel for the Fourth Sunday of Advent, Christmas Eve, and Christmas Day in Feasting on the Word: Lectionary Commentary Series, Year B, Vol. 1 (Louisville: Westminster/ John Knox, 2008), 93–97, 117–121, 141–145.
- "Liturgy," in Encyclopedia of Protestantism, ed. Hans Hillerbrand, (New York: Routledge, 2003), 1112–1113.
- "Marriage and the Church’s Mission," forthcoming in Liturgy, Summer 2016.
- "A Table for the Garden," forthcoming in Liturgy, Spring 2016.
- "Why Ashes Matter," forthcoming in Journal for Preachers, Lent 2016.
- "Feasting at the Table of the Word: The Liturgical Generativity of the Lectionary," Liturgy, Vol. 29, No. 4 (2014), 18–26.
- "Singing in the Kingdom," Call to Worship: Liturgy, Music, Preaching and the Arts, Vol. 47, No. 2 (2014), 72–74.
- "Bodily Worship," Call to Worship, Vol. 45, No. 4 (May, 2012), 1–5.
- "Loving Jesus," Journal for Preachers, Vol. XXXIV, No. 2 (Lent 2011), 25–31.
- "What Makes an Excellent Worship Leader," Clergy Journal, Vol. 87, No. 6 (Nov/Dec.) 2010, 6–8.
- "Beyond the Merely Adequate: Poetic Sensibility in Liturgical Language," Liturgy, Vol. 25, No. 2 (2010), 3–11.
- "Preaching the Advent Texts," Journal for Preachers, Vol. XXXI, No. 1 (Advent 2009), 3–8.
- "’The Lord Be With You:’ The Language of Gesture in Eucharistic Prayer," Reformed Worship (88), June 2008, 10-11.
- "Speaking Grace, Making Space: The Art of Worship Leadership," Journal of Religious Leadership, Vol. 7, No. 1 (Spring 2008) 35–52.
- "In From the Street: When Homeless Christians Join the Worshiping Assembly," Journal for Preachers, Vol. XXX, No. 3 (Easter 2008), 31–40.
- "Forty Days in the Womb: Worship in Lent," Journal for Preachers, Vol. XXX, No. 2 (Lent 2007), 9–15.
- "The Shepherd Jesus"(sermon), Journal for Preachers, Vol. XXVIX, No. 3 (Easter 2006), 51–54.
- "Holy Waiting," Journal for Preachers, Vol. XXVIX, No. 1 (Advent 2005), 15–21.
- "Ravished with the Love of Christ: Summary of a Dissertation," Call to Worship, Vol. 39, No. 1 (2005), 65–75.
- "May the Lord Bless You and Keep You: Liturgy as the Locus of Blessing," Call to Worship, Vol. 38, No. 4 (May 2005), 3–9.
- "Who Are These People?" (sermon), Journal for Preachers, Vol. XXVIII, No. 3 (Easter 2005), 27–30.
- "Stammering Mystery, Dancing Joy: The Many Languages of Easter Worship," Journal for Preachers, Vol. XXVII, No. 3 (Easter 2004), 10–17.
- "The Communion Sermons of James McGready: Sacramental Theology and Scots-Irish Piety on the Kentucky Frontier,"Journal of Presbyterian History, Vol. 80, No. 1 (Spring 2002), 3–16.
