= Matthew 2:13 =

- ← 2:12 2:14 →
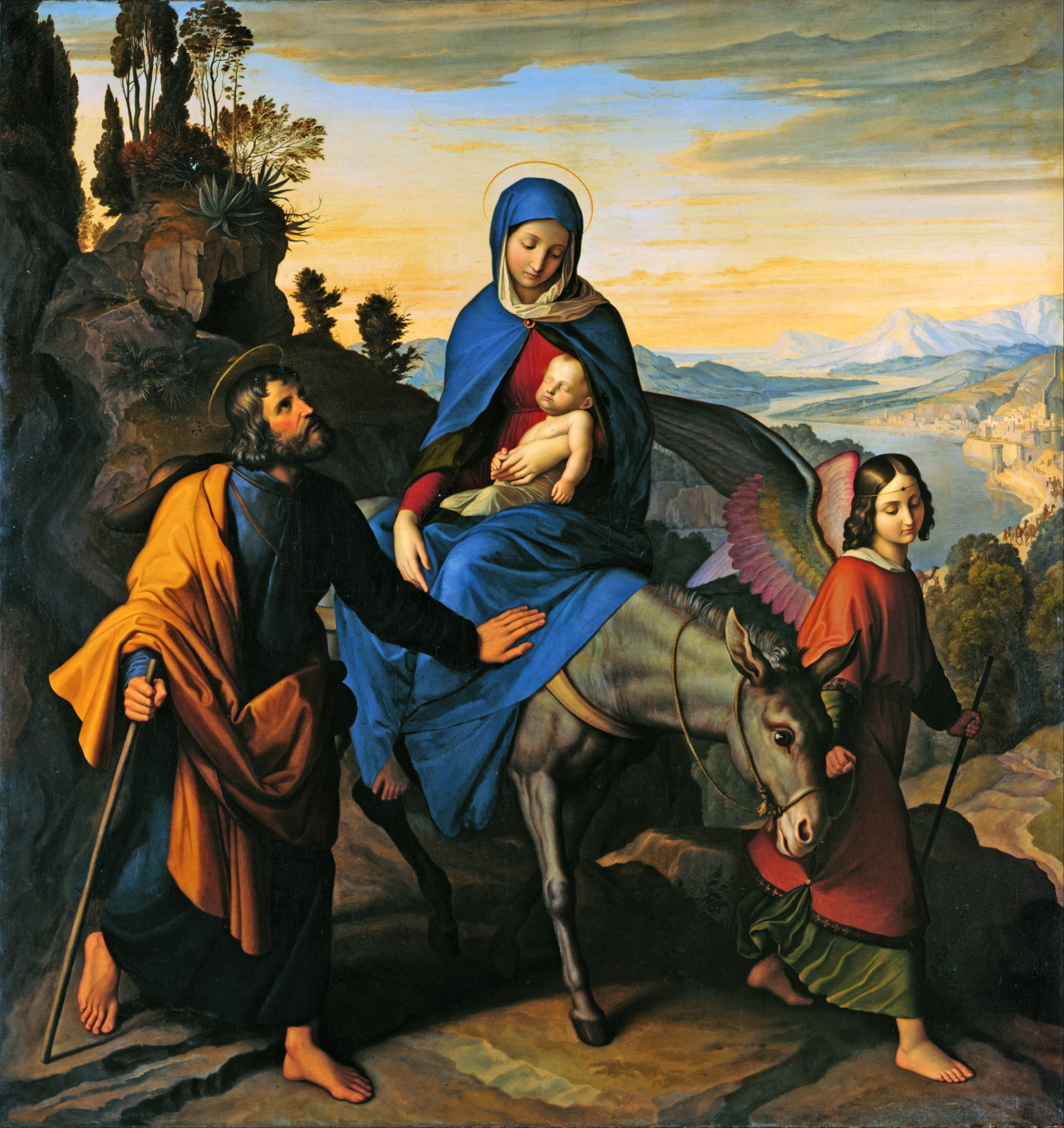
- "The Flight into Egypt". Painting by Julius Schnorr von Carolsfeld (1828).
- Book: Gospel of Matthew
- Christian Bible part: New Testament

Matthew 2:13 is the thirteenth verse of the second chapter of the Gospel of Matthew in the New Testament. The magi have left after paying homage to the young Jesus. In this verse an angel warns Joseph that he must flee.

== Content ==
In the King James Version of the Bible the text reads:

And when they were departed, behold,
the angel of the Lord appeareth to
Joseph in a dream, saying, Arise, and
take the young child and his mother,
and flee into Egypt, and be thou there
until I bring thee word: for Herod will
seek the young child to destroy him.

The World English Bible translates the passage as:

Now when they had departed, behold,
an angel of the Lord appeared to
Joseph in a dream, saying, "Arise
and take the young child and his
mother, and flee into Egypt, and stay
there until I tell you, for Herod will
seek the young child to destroy him."

The Novum Testamentum Graece text is:

Ἀναχωρησάντων δὲ αὐτῶν,
ἰδοὺ ἄγγελος Κυρίου φαίνεται κατ’ ὄναρ
τῷ Ἰωσὴφ λέγων
Ἐγερθεὶς παράλαβε τὸ παιδίον
καὶ τὴν μητέρα αὐτοῦ
καὶ φεῦγε εἰς Αἴγυπτον,
καὶ ἴσθι ἐκεῖ ἕως ἂν εἴπω σοι
μέλλει γὰρ Ἡρῴδης ζητεῖν τὸ παιδίον τοῦ ἀπολέσαι αὐτό.

For a collection of other versions see BibleHub Matthew 2:13.

== Analysis ==
This verse opens a clear second section of Matthew 2 launching a series of dream inspired wanderings by the Holy Family. Its content is closely linked with the second half of Matthew 1. Joseph, after being ignored in the first half of the chapter, is again the central character. As in Matthew 1 Joseph is contacted by God in a dream. This verse is again clear that the child is not Joseph's.

Egypt was the logical place to seek refuge as it was outside the dominions of King Herod. Throughout the Old Testament, it was the standard place of exile for those unsafe in Israel. At the time it had a large Jewish population, with about a third of Alexandria being Jewish. Both regions were at the time part of the Roman Empire, making travel between them easy and relatively safe. The trip to Egypt occurs nowhere else in the New Testament gospels. The mention of Egypt is in keeping with Matthew's interest in Old Testament sources, with the links to Moses being the most prominent.

== Commentary from the Church Fathers ==
Rabanus Maurus: Here Matthew omits the day of purification when the first-born must be presented in the Temple with a lamb, or a pair of turtle doves, or pigeons. Their fear of Herod did not make them bold to transgress the Law, that they should not present the Child in the temple. As soon then as the rumour concerning the Child begins to be spread abroad, the Angel is sent to bid Joseph carry Him into Egypt.

Saint Remigius: By this that the Angel appears always to Joseph in sleep, is mystically signified that they who rest from mundane cares and secular pursuits, deserve angelic visitations.

Hilary of Poitiers: The first time when he would teach Joseph that she was lawfully espoused, the Angel called the Virgin his espoused wife; but after the birth she is only spoken of as the Mother of Jesus. As wedlock was rightfully imputed to her in her virginity, so virginity is esteemed venerable in her as the mother of Jesus.

Preceded by Matthew 2:12	Gospel of Matthew; Chapter 2	Succeeded by Matthew 2:14
