= Thomas G. Long =

Thomas Grier Long (born in 1946) is the Bandy Professor Emeritus of Preaching at Candler School of Theology at Emory University in Atlanta, Georgia. He received his BA degree from Erskine College in 1968, the Master of Divinity from Erskine Theological Seminary in 1971, and the Ph.D. from Princeton Theological Seminary in 1980. He began his career as a preacher at McElroy Memorial Associate Reformed Presbyterian Church near Atlanta, Georgia and since that time has taught at a number of seminaries, including Erskine, Columbia, Princeton, and Candler.

In 1996, Long was named one of the twelve most effective preachers in the English speaking world by Baylor University, along with Fred Craddock, Billy Graham, James Forbes, Barbara Brown Taylor, Peter Gomes, and William Willimon. He was ordained in the Associate Reformed Presbyterian Church and currently a minister in the Presbyterian Church (U.S.A.). He is married to professor of sacramental and liturgical worship Kimberly Bracken Long.

Long's field is in Homiletics and is a strong proponent of the two pillars of preaching: strong exegetical work held along with strong presentation skills. Preaching magazine named his Witness of Preaching one of the 25 most influential books on preaching in the past 25 years. A standard textbook in seminary and undergraduate preaching courses, the book advocates exegetical method seeking to discern a claim from the text to provide clarity of focus and function in sermons.

== Books and publications ==
- Proclaiming the Parables; Preaching and Teaching the Kingdom of God (2024), ISBN 978-0-664-26861-9
- What Shall We Say? (2011), ISBN 978-0-8028-7139-8
- Accompanying Them With Singing: The Christian Funeral (2009), ISBN 978-0-664-23319-8
- Preaching from Memory to Hope (2009), ISBN 978-0-664-23422-5
- The Witness of Preaching, Second Edition (2005), ISBN 0-664-22943-3, ISBN 978-0-664-22943-6
- Testimony: Talking Ourselves into Being Christian (2004), ISBN 0-7879-6832-3, ISBN 978-0-7879-6832-8
- Beyond the Worship Wars: Building Vital and Faithful Worship (2001)
- Hebrews (Interpretation) (1997) ISBN 978-0-8042-3133-6
- Preaching and the Literary Forms of the Bible (1989) ISBN 0-8006-2313-4
