= Matthew 2:16 =

- ← 2:15 2:17 →
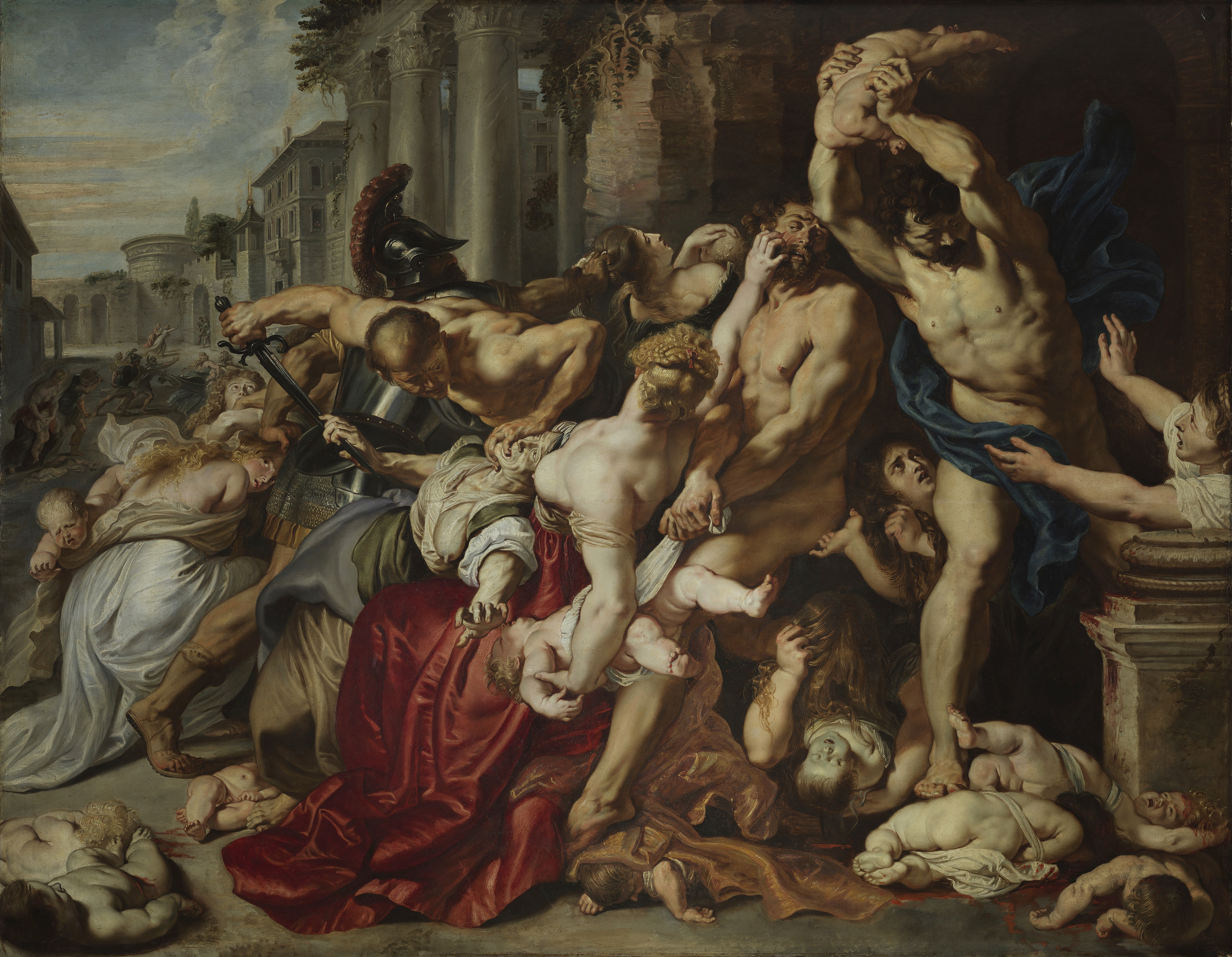
- Rubens' Massacre of the Innocents
- Book: Gospel of Matthew
- Christian Bible part: New Testament

Matthew 2:16 is the sixteenth verse of the second chapter of the Gospel of Matthew in the New Testament.

Joseph and Mary had been visited by an angel and told that Herod would attempt to kill Jesus, their son. Doing as told, they took their infant son and fled by night into Egypt, where they stayed until Herod had died. The three Magi were separately warned in a dream of the threat that King Herod posed and went home by a different route than they came.

Herod had planned to make the Magi tell him of the whereabouts of the Christ child. When he heard of the Magi's change in course, he grew angry and tried to kill the infant messiah by killing all the young children in the area, an event known as the Massacre of the Innocents.

== Content ==
In the King James Version of the Bible the text reads:

Then Herod, when he saw that he was mocked of the wise men,
was exceeding wroth, and sent forth, and slew all the children
that were in Bethlehem, and in all the coasts thereof, from
two years old and under, according to the time which he had diligently
inquired of the wise men.

The World English Bible translates the passage as:

Then Herod, when he saw that he was mocked by the wise men,
was exceedingly angry, and sent out, and killed all the male children
who were in Bethlehem and in all the surrounding countryside, from
two years old and under, according to the exact time which he had
learned from the wise men.

The Novum Testamentum Graece text is:

Τότε Ἡρῴδης ἰδὼν ὅτι ἐνεπαίχθη ὑπὸ τῶν μάγων
ἐθυμώθη λίαν, καὶ ἀποστείλας ἀνεῖλεν πάντας τοὺς παῖδας
τοὺς ἐν Βηθλεὲμ καὶ ἐν πᾶσι
τοῖς ὁρίοις αὐτῆς ἀπὸ διετοῦς καὶ κατωτέρω,
κατὰ τὸν χρόνον ὃν ἠκρίβωσεν παρὰ τῶν μάγων.

For a collection of other versions see BibleHub Matthew 2:16

== Analysis ==
Brown notes that the then, when construction is used throughout Matthew to indicate a change of scene as in this case where the narrative moves from the Holy Family to King Herod.

The word empaizein is variously translated as deceived or mocked; in reality, Brown notes that the word is a combination of the two ideas and has no direct English translation.

Clarke notes that the description of Herod as "exceeding wroth" has been central to Herod's perception and was the foundation for how the king was portrayed in the mystery cycles of the past and in modern popular culture. Herod was documented to have killed his own sons (Antipater, Alexander and Aristobulus) when he perceived them as threats to his throne, as recounted in the compendium Saturnalia (compiled by Macrobius) that Augustus remarked "It is better to be Herod's pig than his son."

Jones notes that "surroundings" refers to the rural areas around the village of Bethlehem. It does not refer to any other nearby towns or villages. At the time, Bethlehem was a small village and it and its surrounding area would have had a very small population. Albright and Mann estimate the village would have had only some 300 people at the time, Raymond E. Brown estimates it was around a thousand. For all these figures, the number of children killed would have been less than twenty. This number clashes with the traditional view of thousands of deaths, but it helps explain why the massacre was not mentioned by any historians such as Josephus. The killing of all the infants in a small village would have been only one of many massacres Herod is recorded to have carried out in his later years. At the same time, Brown notes that the double word all shows that the author of Matthew is trying to portray a large massacre.

Gundry notes that "two years old and under" properly refers to children who have not entered their second year, thus those twelve months old and younger. That Herod picks this number is considered an important clue to when Jesus was born. It is taken to indicate that close to a year had elapsed since the birth of Jesus. Herod is believed to have died in 4 BC so based on Matthew, Jesus' birth is guessed to have been in 5 or 6 BC.

== Commentary from the Church Fathers ==
Pseudo-Chrysostom: When the infant Jesus had subdued the Magi, not by the might of His flesh, but the grace of His Spirit, Herod was exceeding wrath, that they whom he sitting on his throne had no power to move, were obedient to an Infant lying in a manger. Then by their contempt of him the Magi gave further cause of wrath. For when kings’ wrath is stirred by fear for their crowns, it is a great and inextinguishable wrath. But what did he? He sent and slew all the children. As a wounded beast rends whatsoever meeteth it as if the cause of its smart, so he mocked by the Magi spent his fury on children. He said to himself in his fury, ‘Surely the Magi have found the Child whom they said should be King;’ for a king in fear for his crown fears all things, suspects all. Then he sent and slew all those infants, that he might secure one among so many.

Augustine: And while he thus persecutes Christ, he furnished an army (of martyrs) clothed in white robes of the same age as the Lord.

Augustine: Behold how this unrighteous enemy never could have so much profited these infants by his love, as he did by his hate; for as much as iniquity abounded against them, so much did the grace of blessing abound on them.

Augustine: O blessed infants! He only will doubt of your crown in this your passion for Christ, who doubts that the baptism of Christ has a benefit for infants. He who at His birth had Angels to proclaim Him, the heavens to testify, and Magi to worship Him, could surely have prevented that these should not have died for Him, had He not known that they died not in that death, but rather lived in higher bliss. Far be the thought, that Christ who came to set men free, did nothing to reward those who died in His behalf, when hanging on the cross He prayed for those who put Him to death.

Rabanus Maurus: He is not satisfied with the massacre at Bethlehem, but extends it to the adjacent villages; sparing no age from the child of one night old, to that of two years.

Augustine: The Magi had seen this unknown star in the heavens, not a few days, but two years before, as they had informed Herod when he enquired. This caused him to fix two years old and under; as it follows, according to the time he had enquired of the Magi.

Augustine: Or because he feared that the Child to whom even stars ministered, might transform His appearance to greater or under that of His own age, or might conceal all those of that age: hence it seems to be that he slew all from one day to two years old.

Augustine: Or, disturbed by pressure of still more imminent dangers, Herod's thoughts are drawn to other thoughts than the slaughter of children, he might suppose that the Magi, unable to find Him whom they had supposed born, were ashamed to return to him. So the days of purification being accomplished, they might go up in safety to Jerusalem. And who does not see that that one day they may have escaped the attention of a King occupied with so many cares, and that afterwards when the things done in the Temple came to be spread abroad, then Herod discovered that he had been deceived by the Magi, and then sent and slew the children.

Bede: In this death of the children the precious death of all Christ's martyrs is figured; that they were infants signifies, that by the merit of humility alone can we come to the glory of martyrdom; that they were slain in Bethlehem and the coasts thereof, that the persecution shall be both in Jerusalem whence the Church originated, and throughout the world; in those of two years old are figured the perfect in doctrine and works; those under that age the neophytes; that they were slain while Christ escaped, signifies that the bodies of the martyrs may be destroyed by the wicked, but that Christ cannot be taken from them.

Preceded by Matthew 2:15	Gospel of Matthew; Chapter 2	Succeeded by Matthew 2:17
