= List of Teletubbies episodes =

This is a list of Teletubbies episodes and videos.

== Series overview ==
Season	Era	Episodes	Originally released	
Season	Era	Episodes	First released	Last released
1	Original	118	31 March 1997	31 December 1997
2	Original	126	1 January 1998	31 December 1998
3	Original	56	1 January 1999	17 December 1999
4	Original	30	31 July 2000	22 December 2000
5	Original	35	1 January 2001	16 February 2001
1	Revival	15	9 November 2015	27 November 2015
2	Revival	45	18 January 2016	4 November 2016
3	Revival	40	14 March 2017	20 October 2017
4	Revival	20	4 June 2018	12 October 2018

== Original series (1997–2001) ==
=== Season 1 (1997) ===
No.	Title	Original release date
1	"Ned's Bicycle"	31 March 1997
The Teletubbies ride down the slide inside Home Hill. They enjoy Tubby Toast until the Magic Windmill spins. Following this, the characters watch a boy named Ned and his father getting ready for a bicycle trip. Po finds a flag and leads Tinky Winky on a march across Teletubbyland. Dipsy and Laa-Laa see the flag and join in. The Magic Windmill spins again and the Teletubbies go to watch a Magical Event. The Teletubbies gasp in excitement as an animal parade march through Teletubbyland. Afterwards, the animals vanish. The Magic Windmill stops spinning and the "Tubby Bye-Bye" sequence takes place, ending the episode. Featuring: Ned and Nigel Frost
2	"Our Pig Winnie"	1 April 1997
The Teletubbies pop up from behind a hill to say "Eh-oh". They watch a group of siblings named Matthew, James and Mark talk about their pig, Winnie. Following this, the Teletubbies perform a jumping dance. They play a game called "This Little Teletubby," in which Dipsy goes for a walk, the other three stay at Home, Tinky Winky has Tubby Custard, Laa-Laa and Po have no custard, and Dipsy runs home. The Teletubbies wave goodbye afterwards. Featuring: Matthew, James & Mark Carnie
3	"The Grand Old Duke of York"	2 April 1997
The Teletubbies join in a game when a Voice Trumpet sings "The Grand Old Duke of York". The magic windmill brings a musical transmission featuring King Pleasure and the Biscuit Boys. After watching the performance, the Teletubbies do the stamping and stepping dance. A drum appears in Teletubbyland shortly afterwards. Po beats the drum, causing strange things to occur. After the special drum disappears, the magic windmill starts spinning. The Teletubbies watch a Puppet Man singing inside his house. After the house disappears, the Magic Windmill stops spinning and the Teletubbies wave goodbye. Featuring: King Pleasure & The Biscuit Boys, The Pupils of Chuckery Infant's School, Walsall
4	"Naughty Sock"	3 April 1997
The Teletubbies are playing "peek-a-boo." They stop to watch Tamzin Griffin as the Funny Lady. She tells a story about a "Naughty Sock." After the video, Dipsy tries to fall asleep. He is distracted by the other Teletubbies, who are making noise. Tinky Winky, Laa-Laa and Po decide to sleep outside instead. A Voice Trumpet appears and plays "Rock-a Bye Baby." The Magic Windmill spins and the Teletubbies run away before the Magic Windmill stops spinning. The Teletubbies wave goodbye as the episode ends. Featuring: Tamzin Griffin, The Staff and Pupils of Chater Infant's School, Watford
5	"Painting with Hands and Feet"	4 April 1997
The Teletubbies do a Conga dance before the Magic Windmill spins and the Teletubbies watch some children painting with their hands and feet. Later, Tinky Winky comes down the slide inside the Home Hill. As he is about to walk forwards, he stops and says: "Uh Oh!" Somebody has spilled their Tubby Custard on the floor. Whoever it was has left footprints. Tinky Winky follows the footprints to the place where Dipsy is sitting with the rabbits. But Dipsy didn't spill the Tubby Custard. So Tinky Winky and Dipsy follow the footprints to the place where Laa Laa is dancing. But Laa Laa didn't spill the Tubby Custard either. Tinky Winky, Dipsy and Laa Laa follow the trail round Teletubbyland to find out who spilled the Tubby Custard. They soon reach the Home Hill and follow the footprints indoors to the place where Po is fast asleep. They all discover it was Po who spilled the Tubby Custard and they have a good laugh. The Magic Windmill spins and the Teletubbies watch a Tap Dancing Teddy bear in a carousel performing a dance twice before the Magic Windmill stops spinning and it is time for Tubby Bye Bye. Featuring: Ella & Lilly Ainsworth, Emma Beaumont, Christopher Chavez, Rebecca Goldberg, Edward Grant, Saeka Hirari, Tom Jewitt, Daisy & Ned Keogh, Jack Murray, Samantha Nguitgeu, Amy Pittorino, Hartej Ranvanda, Ben Shepherd, Tomas Shepherd, Roisheen Smith, Charlie Snell, Pheobe Syms and Rupinder Vig
6	"Lambs"	7 April 1997
Inside the Teletubbies' Home Hill, Tinky Winky is making some adjustments. Then the Magic Windmill starts to spin so Tinky Winky rushes off to get the Teletubbies and they watch lambs being fed. Later, the Teletubbies are having a sleep, until Dipsy makes up a magic tune and wakes them up. Then the Windmill starts to spin and the Teletubbies rush outside to watch the Magical Event. The Teletubbies hear beautiful music in the distance and they head towards it. They stop outside the Home Hill and gasp in wonder as a magic tree starts to grow, along with leaves and five doves appear too. After the tree and the doves are gone, the Magic Windmill stops spinning and it is time for "Tubby Bye-Bye". Featuring: Matthew, James and Mark Carnie
7	"Playing in the Rain"	8 April 1997
A cloud appears in Teletubbyland. The Teletubbies watch some children playing in the rain. Then the Teletubbies rush off to do the Splashing Dance by the Home Hill. A cloud makes a puddle in Teletubbyland and all the Teletubbies end up stepping in the puddle. The Windmill starts to spin so the Teletubbies rush off to their usual destination in Teletubbyland. The whole Teletubbyland is filled with water and the Teletubbies watch as three magic ships sail through Teletubbyland. After the Three Ships has finished, the Magic Windmill stops spinning and it is time for Tubby Bye Bye. Featuring: The Pupils of Jordans Village Nursery School, Beaconsfield
8	"Dad's Lorry"	9 April 1997
When Teletubbies get inside the Home Hill, Tinky Winky, Dipsy, Laa-Laa and Po goes down the slide, and they go outside in Teletubbyland, then the magic windmill started to spin so Teletubbies say "Uh-oh!" so they run off to watch a girl discussing about her dad's lorry. In Teletubbyland, Dipsy was going for a long walk to see the other Teletubbies. First, Dipsy starts his walk near the Magic Windmill, then goes inside the Home Hill, and Dipsy and Po goes outside the Teletubbyland. So Po found her scooter. And then Dipsy takes another walk. He met Tinky Winky playing his bag. Dipsy then say hello to Tinky Winky, and he says "Eh-oh!" back to Dipsy. Also, Dipsy then goes for another walk. and he climbs up the hill and down the hill, and Laa-Laa's ball bounced up and down behind the hill. Dipsy then says "Eh-oh!" to Laa-Laa. and Laa-Laa says "Eh-oh!" back to Dipsy. and Po rides the scooter is following Dipsy on a walk. Then Po laid down the hill. and you could see a hill with flowers on it, and some trees on the left and on a right. You could see the Magic Windmill behind the hill, and also a rabbit. So Dipsy climbs on the hill to see the far away place. He looked at the Home Hill. So Dipsy keeps walking. So Dipsy and Po takes another walk. Also, Po found her scooter. So Dipsy keeps walking while Po rides her scooter. And Dipsy climbs up the hill and down the hill to see Laa-Laa again. and there's an orange ball again bouncing up and down behind the hilly hill. So Dipsy says "Eh-oh!" to Laa-Laa again. and Laa-Laa says "Eh-oh!" to Dipsy. Then, Dipsy walks by Tinky Winky and says "Eh-oh!" to Tinky Winky. He says "Eh-oh!" to Dipsy. Then, Dipsy says "Eh-oh!" to the rabbits. He could also see the Home Hill, so as the other Teletubbies. Dipsy has a wonderful time on a walk. He goes inside the Home Hill and then Dipsy fetches with the other Teletubbies in time for Tubby Bye-Bye. Featuring: Tim, Stacey & Amy Hesom
9	"Numbers – 1 (version 1)"	10 April 1997
The episodes starts with Laa-Laa outside the superdome, and the Teletubbies do the Running Away Dance. A Voice Trumpet delivers a message that makes Laa-Laa laugh, then the Magic Windmill Spins so The Teletubbies watch some children learning about the number 1. Then the Teletubbies take turns to wear a skirt and Laa-Laa makes Dipsy wear it even though Dipsy doesn't want to. The "Tubby Bye-Bye" Sequence takes place as the Teletubbies go home and the sun sets. Featuring: The pupils of Duncombe School, London
10	"Making Flowers"	11 April 1997
A watering can appears in Teletubbyland. Laa-Laa founds it and she waters some flowers who say:"Lovely water!", then a voice trumpet rises up and sings the nursery rhyme "Mary Mary quite contrary", Laa Laa has fun watering flowers. Then the Magic Windmill starts spinning, so the Teletubbies watch some children make some flowers out of paper. The Teletubbies make up a dance in which they say: "Eh Oh!" to each other and then walk in different directions to each other. But suddenly, Tinky Winky stops and starts walking the same way as the other Teletubbies. They all bump into each other and end up falling over! They then have a Big Hug. The Magic Windmill spins again and the Teletubbies watch the animals march through Teletubbyland. The animals soon vanish and the Magic Windmill stops spinning as the Teletubbies go to do the Tubby Bye-Bye sequence. Featuring: Ella Ainsworth, Kai Barker, Guy Brayn and Anastasia Testen
11	"See-Saw"	14 April 1997
The Teletubbies go down the slide inside the Home Hill. The Magic Windmill starts spinning and they rush outside to watch a film of some children dancing to King Pleasure and the Biscuit Boys playing See-Saw Margery Daw. Later, the Teletubbies watch Po trying to go up on the slide but she keeps sliding down a few times. This is because the slide has "sliding down power." The Magic Windmill starts spinning again, and the Teletubbies rush outside again to watch the Magical Event. A Lion and Bear play hide and seek in Teletubbyland. Then the Teletubbies go to do the Walking Dance. Afterwards, they rush back to where they were and see the Magic Windmill stop spinning, the Teletubbies say: "Uh Oh!" and rush off to do the Tubby Bye-Bye sequence. Featuring: King Pleasure & The Biscuit Boys, The Pupils of Chuckery Infants School, Walsall
12	"Photo Faces"	15 April 1997
Tinky Winky, Dipsy and Laa Laa go running along the hills. Then they say "Eh Oh!" to the viewers. Po appears and goes: "Boo! Eh Oh!" and joins the others. The Magic Windmill spins and the Teletubbies go off to watch some children taking photographs of each other's faces. Later in Teletubbyland, a telescope appears and Dipsy has a good look around. He sees flowers, rabbits, trees and the House. Dipsy then hears some noises and looking through the Telescope, he sees Laa Laa playing with her ball, Tinky Winky opening and shutting his bag and Po smelling some flowers. After that, he sees the Teletubbies having a big hug so he rushes off to join in. The Magic Windmill starts to spin. The Teletubbies say: "Uh-Oh!" and they rush off to watch the magical event. The Magic Tree appears in Teletubbyland, along with the five doves before the Magic Windmill stops spinning and it's Tubby Bye-Bye. Featuring: Tarik Cassim, Gabriel Waddingham, Jay Simpson, Camille St Omer, Kevin & Kirsten Jarin
13	"Owl Babies"	16 April 1997
In the Teletubbyland, Laa Laa was saying Eh Oh to Dipsy, and Dipsy says Eh Oh to Laa Laa, Laa Laa and Dipsy are being silly. Now Dipsy and Laa Laa say Eh Oh to Tinky Winky and Po, and Tinky Winky and Po says Eh Oh to Dipsy and Laa Laa. They were both silly. Meanwhile, Dipsy and Laa Laa says Eh Oh to Tinky Winky and Po again, then Tinky Winky and Po replied. Both Teletubbies were silly. Now Tinky Winky and Po walks on the path, and so as Dipsy and Laa Laa, and Tinky Winky and Po both say Eh Oh to Dipsy and Laa Laa. Then Dipsy and Laa Laa replied. and Laa Laa and Dipsy goes inside the Home Hill. and Tinky Winky and Po goes inside the Home Hill too. And the Teletubbies were saying Eh Oh to each other inside their Home Hill. And they are glad to be at home. Then they say Eh Oh to the Noo Noo. Then the Magic Windmill starts spinning, so they rushed outside to watch Alex Pascall share the story of the owl babies with some children. Then the Teletubbies do the Round and Round Dance by the Home Hill. Featuring: Alex Pascall with Antonio Harris & Samantha Bassom
14	"Larette Tap Dancing"	17 April 1997
The episode begins with the Teletubbies lying on the floor in front of the control panel. They look up at the camera and say: "Eh Oh!" quietly. They are being quiet. Every now and again, they giggle and then look up at the camera and say: "Shh!" The Noo-Noo watches them, however, he decides to be noisy by making his usual sucking and slurping noises. Suddenly, the Teletubbies look to see the Magic Windmill spinning in the distance. This time, they say: "Uh Oh!" loudly and laughing happily, they run out of the house to watch the Magical Event. The Teletubbies watch the gazebo with the Tap Dancing Teddy Bear. Afterwards, the gazebo hovers away into the sky. The Magic Windmill is still spinning and so Tinky Winky and the other Teletubbies watch Larette tap dancing in her garden. Then the Teletubbies do their Tip Toe Dance. It is Noisy Footsteps Day and everyone walks around Teletubbyland in a noisy way. Then the Teletubbies decide to walk quietly. Then it is time for Tubby Toast and the Teletubbies start being noisy once again! The episode ends with them enjoying their Tubby Toast, but the voice trumpet says: "Time for Tubby Bye Bye!" and moaning, the Teletubbies go to do the Tubby Bye-Bye sequence. Featuring: Larette Tritton
15	"Emily and Jester"	18 April 1997
A chair appears and Laa-Laa, Dipsy, and Tinky-Winky have fun standing up and sitting down. The Windmill starts to spin, and the Teletubbies watch Emily riding her pony, Jester. Afterwards, they do the Round and Round Dance near the house, then the Magic Windmill stops spinning and the Tubby Bye-Bye sequence takes place. Featuring: Emily & Nicole Kingman
16	"Delilah Packing"	21 April 1997
The Teletubbies watch Delilah getting ready pack up. Tinky Winky is too full up to finish his Tubby Toast so he puts it in his bag. Tinky Winky goes for a walk and puts all the Teletubbies' favourite things into his bag. Afterwards, the other Teletubbies discover their favourite things are missing. Tinky Winky takes them out again and the other Teletubbies get their favourite things back but suddenly, there is a strange noise from Tinky Winky's bag. Tinky Winky opens the bag to find the rest of his Tubby Toast, then he puts it back in his bag to save it for later. The Magic Windmill spins and the Teletubbies go off to watch the Magic House with the Singing Puppet Man. Afterwards, the Magic Windmill stops spinning. The "Tubby Bye-Bye" sequence takes place. Featuring: Delilah and Cecelia Dumont
17	"Humpty Dumpty"	22 April 1997
The Teletubbies are eating Tubby Toast inside the Home Hill when a voice trumpet rises and says the nursery rhyme Humpty Dumpty. The Teletubbies join in and they end up falling down from the table! The Magic Windmill spins and the Teletubbies watch as Po receives a musical transmission of Humpty Dumpty featuring King Pleasure and the Biscuit Boys. Back in Teletubbyland, Po has a falling down day. She falls out of bed, she falls down from the table and she falls over at the control panel! Even when playing with Laa-Laa and her ball, Po falls over. Later, Tinky Winky is watching the rabbits when Po falls off her scooter. So Tinky Winky falls over. Laa-Laa appears and falls over as well. Finally, Dipsy comes along and he falls over as well! All the Teletubbies have fallen over! Suddenly, the Magic Windmill starts spinning and the Teletubbies rush off to see the Magical Event. The Tap Dancing Teddy Bear visits Teletubbyland in his carousel. Afterward, the Teletubbies do the Jumping Dance. Tinky Winky tries to jump like the other Teletubbies but instead he ends up falling over and rolling away down the hill! Then the Teletubbies take part in the Tubby Bye-Bye sequence. Featuring: King Pleasure & The Biscuit Boys, The Pupils of Chuckery Infants School, Walsall
18	"Feeding the Chickens"	23 April 1997
The Teletubbies dance in and out of the trees. The Magic Windmill spins and they go to watch Matthew, James and Mark feeding their chickens. Back in Teletubbyland, Laa-Laa feels like having Tubby Toast. Tinky-Winky, out for a walk, smells the Tubby Toast and decides to go and have some as well. But the Tubby Toaster makes too much Tubby Toast all over inside the Home Hill! Soon there is Tubby Toast all the table, the floor, the beds and Tinky-Winky! There is Tubby Toast everywhere! Lots of Tubby Toast for Noo Noo, for Po, for Laa-Laa, for Dipsy, for Tinky-Winky and for the rabbits! Lots of Tubby Toast for everybody! Afterwards, the Magic Windmill stops spinning (offscreen) and the Teletubbies go to take part in the Tubby Bye-Bye sequence. Featuring: Matthew, James and Mark Carnie
19	"Helicopter"	24 April 1997
Po plays with the levers and buttons on the control panel inside the Tubbytronic Superdome. Just then she suddenly sees The Magic Windmill spinning. The Teletubbies watch Sam have a ride in a helicopter from Penzance to the Scilly Isles. Back in Teletubbyland, Laa-Laa goes out to play with her ball. She bounces it and then throws it. But she accidentally gets it stuck up a tree. Laa Laa tries to jump up and reach it, but she isn't tall enough to reach her ball Dipsy tries to reach the ball, but he isn't tall enough either. Even Tinky Winky isn't tall enough to reach the ball even when he tries to. Laa-Laa feels very sad because she can't reach her ball. But however, Po thinks she can reach the ball, even though she is the smallest Teletubby of all. She borrows Tinky Winky's bag, spins it around, and releases it. The bag hits the ball and it falls out of the tree. Laa Laa is overjoyed to have her ball back when she is happy and feels better, Tinky Winky gets his bag back and the Teletubbies and the narrator say: "Clever Po!" Then suddenly, the Magic Windmill starts spinning again. The Teletubbies rush off to watch the Magic Event. The Three Magic Ships sail through Teletubbyland. The water then goes down the drain and the Magic Windmill stops spinning. The "Tubby Bye-Bye" sequence takes place. Featuring: Barry & Sam Philpott
20	"Balancing"	25 April 1997
The episode starts with the Teletubbies running along the hills and then they run back again. They then do the Running Away Dance. The Magic Windmill spins and the Teletubbies go off to watch some girls learn about balancing. Later, the Teletubbies take turns to stand on one leg. Afterwards, the Windmill starts to spin and the Teletubbies watch the Animal Parade march through Teletubbyland. Afterwards, the Magic Windmill stops spinning and the Tubby Bye-Bye sequence takes place. Featuring: Jessica Moffat and Lauren Adlington
21	"Building a Barbecue"	28 April 1997
In Teletubbyland, The Teletubbies play boo and say hello to the viewers. Then they rush off to watch a little boy called Thomas and his grandad building a barbecue in their garden. The Teletubbies then do a Splashing Dance by the Home Hill. A Pink Spider appears in Teletubbyland and the voice trumpet appeared saying the nursery rhyme called, "Little Miss Muffet" making Laa-Laa run away first, then Tinky Winky and Dipsy run away as well! But Po frightens the pink spider away! The Magic Windmill then stops spinning and it was time for Tubby Bye-Bye. Featuring: David and Thomas Armstrong
22	"Jumping"	29 April 1997
The Teletubbies are feeling very happy so they all jump around a tree, Laa-Laa jumps away and Dipsy goes to Hide. Tinky-Winky and Po run around Teletubbyland, but soon Tinky Winky runs away leaving Po on her own. She falls down, lies in the Sun and then rolls away. The Magic Windmill starts to spin and the Teletubbies watch a video about children jumping. Later in Teletubbyland, Dipsy jumps for joy when he sees a beautiful flower. Laa Laa jumps to catch her ball, Po jumps to her scooter and Tinky Winky jumps for fun while he is wearing the skirt. A Voice Trumpet plays Piano music, and Tinky Winky jumps on a hill, in front of a tree and in front of the House. After all that jumping, Tinky Winky falls down, feeling very tired. The Magic Windmill starts spinning and the Teletubbies go to watch the carousel with the Tap Dancing Teddy Bear. Afterwards, the Teletubbies do the Stamping and Stepping Dance before Tubby Bye-Bye. Featuring: The Children of The Croft School and The RST Theatre Playgroup, Stratford-upon-Avon
23	"Rockpool"	30 April 1997
Dipsy goes for a walk and sees lots of things in Teletubbyland. A Voice Trumpet asks Dipsy if he can see a Blue Flower, a White Cloud, Green Grass, an Orange Ball and his Favourite Friend (who is Laa-Laa). Laa-Laa appears and they have a Big Hug, then the Magic Windmill starts spinning. The Teletubbies watch as Andy Brown shows some children a rockpool. The Teletubbies do the Walking Dance before "Tubby Bye-Bye." Featuring: Andy Brown with Leon & Chantel Brook
24	"Drawing Cacti"	1 May 1997
Po feels like having Tubby Custard. The Magic Windmill spins and she rushes outside to fetch the other Teletubbies to watch some children visiting a conservatory and drawing cacti. Later, in Teletubbyland, Tinky Winky goes for a walk and nearly throws his bag over the Home Hill! The Magic Windmill spins and the Teletubbies go off to watch the Magical Event. The five doves and the Magic Tree appear in Teletubbyland. After that, they do the Falling Down Dance before the Tubby Bye-Bye sequence.
25	"Washing the Bus"	2 May 1997
The Teletubbies have fun saying "boo!" They then watch some children riding a bus as it is washed at a bus wash. A voice trumpet brings a message for Dipsy and Laa-Laa, and there's time for one more dance before Tubby Bye-Bye. Featuring: Arthur & Molly Dow, Jamie Mason and Louis Shadwick
26	"Café Chocolate"	5 May 1997
Tinky-Winky, Dipsy and Laa-Laa march on a Hill and run away. The Teletubbies watch a little boy making hot chocolate. The Teletubbies make Tubby Custard and then go outside to play, but the Tubby Custard has made them feel very full and they all fall asleep. The Magic Windmill then wakes them up and they run off to watch The Three Ships, then the Windmill stops spinning for the Tubby Bye-Bye sequence. Featuring: Sandy Simmonds and Obadiah Winter
27	"Emily and the Trap"	6 May 1997
The Teletubbies listen to a Voice Trumpet inside the Tubbytronic Superdome saying, "Trit trot" and they join in. The Teletubbies rush outside to watch Emily ride in her trap. Po is riding her scooter faster and slower and chasing the other Teletubbies around the Tubbytronic Superdome! The Magic Windmill spins and the Teletubbies rush off to see The Magic House appear in Teletubbyland with The Puppet Man singing. The Magic Windmill stops spinning and the Teletubbies take part in the Tubby Bye-Bye sequence. Featuring: Emily & Nicola Kingman
28	"The Beach"	7 May 1997
The Teletubbies are in the Home Hill, listening to a Voice Trumpet play the sound of the sea. The Magic Windmill spins, and the Teletubbies watch some children playing on the beach with a dog named Jesso and a ball. Later, the wind blows Dipsy's hat away, however, it is soon found by Laa-Laa. Then the Teletubbies do the Splashing Dance before Tubby Bye-Bye. Featuring: Thomas & Jonathan Becker, Natasha Marshall and Zoe Robinson
29	"Rolling"	8 May 1997
Inside the Home Hill, the Noo-Noo tidies up Laa-Laa's ball. The Magic Windmill spins and the Teletubbies watch children rolling things up and down a hill. Later in Teletubbyland, Po falls off her scooter and rolls away. She rolls into Tinky Winky, who rolls into Dipsy, who rolls into Laa Laa and so all the Teletubbies are rolling away towards the House. Their favourite things follow them. The Teletubbies are so reunited with their favourite things and they have a Big Hug. The Magic Windmill spins and the Teletubbies go to watch the Magical Event. The animals are on the march through Teletubbyland. Afterwards, the Teletubbies do the Tip Toe Dance before taking part in the Tubby Bye Bye sequence. Featuring: The Children of The Croft School, Stratford-upon-Avon
30	"Numbers – 2 (version 1)"	9 May 1997
In Teletubbyland, Dipsy and Laa Laa listen to a voice trumpet sing the nursery rhyme "Jack and Jill", and then they roll away. The Magic Windmill spins and the Teletubbies watch some children learn about the number 2. Back in Teletubbyland, Laa Laa plays Peek a Boo and Tinky-Winky surprises her. The Magic Windmill spins for the Lion and Bear. The Teletubbies do the Running Away dance before the sun sets for Tubby Bye-Bye. Featuring: The Children of Duncombe School, London
31	"Swimming With Stephanie"	12 May 1997
The Teletubbies take a nap, Then, they suddenly wake up to see The Magic Windmill spinning, The Teletubbies watch Stephanie go for a swim. Back in Teletubbyland, the Teletubbies watch the clouds float by. Suddenly, a little puffy cloud floats inside the Home Hill! The Teletubbies rush inside to have Tubby Custard but they found it rather inconvenient having a cloud indoors. Laa-Laa has split her Tubby Custard then the Noo-Noo comes to tidy up the custard and cloud. But all that custard and all that cloud are getting very mixed up inside the Noo-Noo. He goes over to the doors and blows the little puffy cloud outside. The cloud has turned into a Special Pink Tubby Custard Cloud! The Teletubbies wave goodbye to the cloud then they go to do the Jumping Dance. Then the Tubby Bye Bye sequence takes place. Featuring: The Ducklings Water Club, Amersham
32	"Yellow Cow"	13 May 1997
The Teletubbies have Tubby Toast and the Tubby Toaster makes an extra piece, which Noo Noo tidies up. The Teletubbies watch a video of the Funny Lady and a Naughty Yellow Cow. A voice trumpet appears and says the nursery rhyme called, "Ride A Cock Horse" making Laa-Laa joining in then she bumps into Dipsy. She and Dipsy do this again and bump into Tinky Winky and Po who are also joining in. They all do the nursery rhyme again and fall over. The Magic Windmill spins and the Tap Dancing Teddy Bear in his platform appears in Teletubbyland. The Magic Windmill stops spinning before Tubby Bye-Bye. Featuring: Tamzin Griffin, The Children of Chater Infants School, Watford
33	"Mum's Keyboard"	14 May 1997
In Teletubbyland, the Teletubbies were dancing, then everything stops when the Magic Windmill started to spin so they run off to watch two boys play with their Mum's keyboard. Inside the Superdome, Dipsy decides to make some adjustments. Then the Magic Windmill started to spin, so he rushed outside to get the others and see the magical house with 4 windows appear in the Teletubbyland and appears to be a shadow behind the window and appears to be a puppet man singing. And the Magic Windmill stops spinning for Tubby Bye-Bye. Featuring: The Word Girl with Greg & Mathew Tierney
34	"Walking in the Woods"	15 May 1997
Laa-Laa feels like giving all the other Teletubbies a big hug. Where is Tinky Winky? Laa Laa soon finds him and the Teletubbies watch some children who are going for a walk in the woods. The Teletubbies do the Falling Down Dance. Soon the Windmill spins and the Teletubbies go to watch the Magic Tree as it appears in Teletubbyland. The white doves fly onto the tree's branches. Soon they fly away. The tree loses its leaves and it disappears. The Magic Windmill stops spinning. The "Tubby Bye-Bye" sequence takes place. Featuring: Fraser Hopkin, Sarah Wichall and Denise Moir
35	"Strawberry Picking"	16 May 1997
The Teletubbies try to make some Tubby Custard but the Tubby Custard Machine doesn't work, The Windmill starts to spin and they watch some children picking strawberries. Back in Teletubbyland, the Teletubbies do the Round and Round Dance, then a present appears in Teletubbyland and Laa-Laa wonders who it's for, she looks at the label to see a picture of Dipsy, when Laa-Laa shows the present to Dipsy he keeps running away so she opens the present for him. It's a special decoration for Dipsy's Hat, Laa-Laa puts it on Dipsy's Hat and it looks lovely. The Magic Windmill stops spinning, the decoration and the present disappear and it is time for Tubby Bye-Bye.
36	"Shadows"	19 May 1997
Po looks after the Teletubbies' favorite things. The Teletubbies watch some children about shadows before doing the Walking Dance before Tubby Bye-Bye. Featuring: Kevin & Kirsten Jarin, Jay Simpson and Camille St Omer
37	"Painting Swings"	20 May 1997
The Teletubbies watch some children painting pictures. And a magic book appears in Teletubbyland. The Magic Windmill stops spinning and it is time for Tubby Bye-Bye. Featuring: Sophie Herxheimer with Poppy Abbott and Simeon Bond
38	"My Mum's a Doctor"	21 May 1997
Po rides on her scooter in circles before the Magic Windmill spins and the Teletubbies watch a mother who is a doctor and Po has too much Tubby Custard and she gets Tubby Custard tummy. She doesn't feel very good because she ate too quickly and gets her case of hiccups so Laa-Laa comes in and realizes what is going on. Po tells her that she had eaten too much of her Tubby Custard. So Laa-Laa walks her to bed. She sings a lullaby to help Po sleep and feel better. After that, she feels much better and cannot eat too much Tubby Custard ever again. Then the Teletubbies do the Stamping and Stepping Dance before Tubby Bye Bye. Featuring: Dr Helen Gabathuler and Jenny Crook
39	"Tweet Tweet"	22 May 1997
The Teletubbies are enjoying their Tubby Toast when a Voice Trumpet rises and says 'YOOH' and then the Teletubbies copy that phrase. The Teletubbies watch Alex Pascall and some children go looking for birds in the park. A butterfly from the Animal Parade appears in Teletubbyland. Eventually, the butterfly goes into the house, where it lands on the Noo Noo's sucker, making him sneeze. The butterfly flies away and the Teletubbies say goodbye to it. Suddenly, they see the Magic Windmill spinning and go off to watch the Magical Event. The Animal Parade march through Teletubbyland. Before long, the Magic Windmill stops spinning and it is time for Tubby Bye Bye. Featuring: Alex Pascall, The Children of Montem Infant's School, London
40	"Bubbles"	23 May 1997
Tinky Winky tries to sleep, but before he can sleep, Noo Noo keeps trying to tidy up his blanket and wake him up. The Teletubbies watch some children making bubbles. Magic things happen to Laa-Laa's ball when she throws it, it turns Big and Small, it changes into shapes and then it turns into the Letter e and then back to normal.The Windmill spins for the Three Ships.The Teletubbies do the Splashing Dance before Tubby Bye-Bye. Featuring: Sabina Begum, Harpreet Singh and Emran Uddin
41	"Gospel Singing"	23 June 1997
The Teletubbies run over some hills and then back again. The Windmill starts to spin and the Teletubbies watch a little girl whose mother is a very good singer. The Teletubbies play a game called Four Happy Teletubbies, they all jump around a bush, Laa Laa then jumps away, Dipsy hides behind the bush, Tinky Winky and Po run away and Po then rolls away. Laa Laa plays a game of Peek a Boo and she meets Tinky Winky, they both see Dipsy's hat behind the bush and he comes back out from the bush, Po then rolls back and they play their game again. This time both Laa Laa and Po jump away, Dipsy hides behind the bush, Po comes back and her, Dipsy and Tinky Winky hide from Laa Laa who then comes back. The Teletubbies want to play again and again but the Windmill stops Spinning and it's time for Tubby Bye Bye. Featuring: Patricia Danton and Kanem Hutchinson, The Members of The Astral Centre Sunday School, Birmingham
42	"Mark and Zoe Cooking"	24 June 1997
Po comes in and says "Eh-oh!" a Voice Trumpet rises and She listens to "Pat A Cake" over and over, but she is sad and lonely because she has no one to play "Pat A Cake" with, until Laa-Laa slides down coming to cheer her up. She says "Eh-oh!" to Po and sits next to her and Po shows her how to play "Pat A Cake". She and Laa-Laa listen to "Pat A Cake" and Laa Laa and Po happily play "Pat A Cake" together. Then Tinky Winky and Dipsy come in and decide to join in but they are interrupted by the Windmill and can't play "Pat A Cake" now. The Teletubbies watch Mark and Zoe decorate a cake with butter icing, chocolate and strawberries. Back in Teletubbyland, the narrator sings a song about Dipsy's hat whilst the hat plays tricks on Dipsy. Afterwards, the Teletubbies come out of the Home Hill and see the Magic Windmill spinning, and so they go to watch the Magic Tree event before the Windmill stops spinning and the Tubby Bye-Bye sequence takes place. Featuring: Marc Connor and Zoe Williams
43	"Arthur Robot Story"	25 June 1997
The Teletubbies pop over a hill to say Eh Oh then the Magic Windmill spins and the Teletubbies watch a boy named Arthur reading a story about a robot. Later in Teleubbyland, Tinky Winky, Dipsy and Laa Laa wake up and go outside, Po wakes up and looks out the window, she sees the other Teletubbies Jumping, waving their legs and running around in circles, so Po does all these things on her own, a Voice Trumpet (not shown rising) plays some piano music while she does this. Afterwards, the other Teletubbies come in and everyone goes to sleep. Suddenly, the Teletubbies wake up again and see the Magic Windmill spinning, so they go to watch the Tap Dancing Teddy Bear, before the Magic Windmill stops spinning and it is time for Tubby Bye-Bye. Featuring: Florence, Arthur and Agnes Fullalove
44	"Hey Diddle Diddle"	26 June 1997
Dipsy and Laa Laa listen to a Voice Trumpet singing Hey Diddle Diddle. The Magic Windmill spins and then Laa Laa receives a video of some children dancing with King Pleasure and the Biscuit Boys as they play "Hey Diddle Diddle." Then later inside the Tubbytronic superdome, a Voice Trumpet rises and sings the operatic version of Hey Diddle Diddle and the Teletubbies join in. The Teletubbies run around the Tubbytronic Superdome and the Voice Trumpet keeps singing Hey Diddle Diddle once more until the Teletubbies say: "Again, again!" But the Voice Trumpet goes down and the Magic Windmill starts spinning then the Teletubbies run out of the house with the Magic Windmill still spinning until moments later when it stops spinning and it is time for Tubby Bye Bye. Featuring: King Pleasure & The Biscuit Boys, The Pupils of Chuckery Infants School, Walsall
45	"Dirty Dog"	27 June 1997
The Teletubbies eat Tubby Toast and the Tubby Toaster makes one extra. All of the Teletubbies want it but the Noo-Noo tidies it up. Laa Laa receives a video of some kids playing in the rain and their dog gets dirty, so they have to give the dog a bath. The Teletubbies do the Splashing Dance before watching the Lion and Bear play hide and seek in Teletubbyland, the Magic Windmill starts spinning from the Original animation, the Teletubbies saying "Uh-Oh", then the Magic Windmill stops spinning and it's time for "Tubby Bye-Bye." Featuring: Jamie Gilchrist and Emily Hills
46	"Going for a Walk"	30 June 1997
Inside the House the Teletubbies crawl through the Arch one by one. Then they watch some Children going for a long Walk. Laa Laa decides to go for a Happy Walk, Tinky Winky and Dipsy decide to go too, but Laa Laa doesn't know that. When Laa Laa decides to do a Happy Dance, she finds Tinky Winky and Dipsy dancing with her, Po arrives on her Scooter and decides to dance with them, What a Happy Day. The Teletubbies rush off to watch The Animal Parade before doing the Stamping and Stepping Dance and it is time for Tubby-Bye-Bye. Featuring: Bethany Arnold, Jasmine Edmonds, Chloe Guy, Jeremy Harris and Florence Simms
47	"Music with Debbie"	1 July 1997
Tinky Winky, Dipsy and Laa-Laa runs up and down the hill to say "Eh-Oh!" to the viewers, just as Po pops up and says "Boo!" and says "Eh-Oh!", then the Magic Windmill starts to spin as they run off, Po receives a video of some children joining in the music with Debbie. Laa-Laa makes up a song which makes the other Teletubbies run away. Then they do the Tip Toe Dance twice before Tubby Bye-Bye. Featuring: Debbie Ivens, The Crescendo Kids
48	"Numbers – 3 (version 1)"	2 July 1997
Tinky-Winky, Dipsy and Laa-Laa march on a Hill counting to 3 then they run away. The Teletubbies watch some children learn about the number three. Dipsy climbs a steep hill and the Three Ships sail through Teletubbyland. There's plenty of time for a Walking Dance before "Tubby Bye-Bye." Featuring: The Children of Duncombe School, London
49	"Haymaking"	3 July 1997
The Teletubbies pop up from a hill, saying "Boo!", then the Magic Windmill starts spinning so the Teletubbies watch Matthew, James and Mark making hay on their farm. They load the hay bales on a trailer attached to a tractor after they made hay bales and the tractor takes them to a barn. The Magic Windmill spins again, and therefore The Magic Tree appears in Teletubbyland. It's Time for Tubby Toast and Noo-noo tidies Tinky Winky's Bag, Dipsy's Hat and Laa Laa's Ball and then they chase him around the House but they can't catch him, so Po chases Noo Noo on her Scooter, then Noo Noo gives back the favourite things. The "Tubby Bye-Bye" sequence takes place just as The Baby Sun sets. Featuring: Matthew, James & Mark Carnie
50	"Naughty Cloud"	4 July 1997
The Teletubbies dance around a tree. The Teletubbies and a group of children watch Tamzin Griffin pretend to be Funny Lady and tell the story of the naughty cloud. An umbrella appears in Teletubbyland, Po finds it, a cloud appears and starts to rain so Po uses the umbrella. A Voice Trumpet ( not shown rising ) sings the nursery rhyme ' It's raining, it's pouring, the old man is snoring', the umbrella disappears, it starts to rain again and the voice trumpet says the nursery rhyme 'rain rain go away' and the cloud goes away. The Teletubbies do the Running Away Dance before "Tubby Bye-Bye. Featuring: Tamzin Griffin, The Children of Chater Infants School, Watford
51	"I Want To Be A Vet"	7 July 1997
The Teletubbies walk up and down some hills before they watch a little girl called Olivia take her rabbit to the vet. Po decides to play a hiding game, she hides behind the Tubby Toaster and all the Teletubbies join in, one by one. Then The Noo-Noo tidies up the Teletubbies' favourite things before Tubby Bye Bye. Featuring: Michelle Felstein with Olivia & Jane Lambert
52	"Ned's Potatoes"	8 July 1997
The Teletubbies were bouncing to the Tubby Custard Machine, The Teletubbies were then making Tubby Custard. Before this, The Noo Noo sucked up Laa-Laa's ball. Then, The Teletubbies were now bouncing to the Teletubby Table, but before this, the Tubby Custard made a mess They went outside to watch a video of Ned with his grandmother digging for potatoes. Before doing the Jumping Dance, Noo Noo tells the Teletubbies to go down the slide, and outside. Then, They do the Jumping Dance before Tubby Bye Bye. Featuring: Ned Frost and Sylvia Philpin Jones
53	"Digging in the Sand for Worms"	9 July 1997
The Teletubbies run and say 'boo' then the Magic Windmill spins and the Teletubbies watch Andy Brown and the children go digging in the sand for worms. Po rides her Scooter around the House, Laa Laa has a turn at riding Po's Scooter but Laa Laa won't give Po back the Scooter, so the Narrator decides that they should share the Scooter, Laa Laa and Po have Fun sharing the Scooter, then the Windmill starts spinning. The Animal Parade marches through Teletubbyland. The Teletubbies do the Stamping and Stepping Dance before Tubby Bye Bye. Featuring: Andy Brown with Emily Fifield and Millie & Francome May
54	"Sarah, Fraser and the Ducks"	10 July 1997
A voice trumpet rises and makes duck sounds. Laa Laa finds it funny before the Magic Windmill spins and the Teletubbies watch Sarah and Fraser feeding ducks. Po enters the house and makes Tubby Toast. Po catches the Tubby Toast and plays with it. Po makes more Tubby Toast but it bounces around the house and Noo-Noo sucks the toast up. Po chases the Noo-Noo around the house before the Magic Windmill spins and the Teletubbies watch the Three Ships then they do the Tip-Toe dance before the Sun baby giggles for Tubby Bye Bye Featuring: Fraser Hopkin, Sarah Wichall and Denise Moir
55	"Throwing"	11 July 1997
The Teletubbies wake up, and a Voice Trumpet rises to guide the Teletubbies in their morning exercises, but then they get tired of repeating the same exercises over and over again and run away. They watch Jameela and Daniel throwing a ball and they play a game together. Laa-Laa and Po play catch with Laa-Laa's Ball, but they throw it too far, Dipsy catches it and throws it too far, then Tinky-Winky catches it. The Magic Tree appears and then the Teletubbies do the Round and Round Dance before Tubby Bye-Bye. Featuring: Jameela Green and Daniel Slavin
56	"Lighthouse"	14 July 1997
When Po is eating her Tubby Toast, she listens to a Voice Trumpet sing Twinkle Twinkle Little Star and a magical star appears. She hears Tinky Winky, Dipsy and Laa-Laa coming back and shows them the magical star before it disappears. The Teletubbies watch two children whose father is a lighthouse keeper and learn that lighthouses have lots of steps. The Teletubbies then watch The Three Ships sail through Teletubbyland. The Magic Windmill stops spinning as the "Tubby Bye-Bye" sequence takes place. Featuring: Terri-Lee Binns, Paul & Richard Clark
57	"Naughty Bee"	15 July 1997
The Teletubbies were very busy with their favourite things. Tinky Winky had the bag, Dipsy had the hat, Laa-Laa had the ball and Po had the scooter. The Teletubbies play with their favourite things before the Magic Windmill spins and the Teletubbies watch some children listening to Funny Lady telling a story of Naughty Bee. The Teletubbies walk down the path with their favourite things and Po rides her scooter inside and outside Home Hill then all the Teletubbies fall down. The Sun baby giggles and the Teletubbies do the Running Away Dance. Featuring: Tamzin Griffin, The Children of Chater Infants School, Watford
58	"Paddling Pool"	16 July 1997
In the Teletubbies' Superdome, Dipsy has Tubby Toast and makes some adjustments on the Control Panel, but the Noo Noo tidies up his Tubby Toast. The Windmill spins and the Teletubbies go to watch Amy, Cameron and Alice playing in their paddling pool. Later, the Teletubbies do the Splashing Dance by the Home Hill. Then the Magic Windmill spins and the Teletubbies rush off to watch the Magical Event. The Lion & the Bear appear in Teletubbyland and the Magic Windmill stops spinning. It's time for Tubby Bye Bye. Featuring: Cameron & Alice Denton and Amy Leigh-Quine
59	"Numbers – 5 (version 1)"	17 July 1997
The Teletubbies do a conga line, then watch children learn about the number 5. Tinky-Winky, Dipsy and Laa-Laa play a jumping game and they count to 5 in 3 different languages (Welsh, Urdu and Spanish). They ask Po to join them, but she didn't want to, she wanted to ride her scooter. Once the game is over, they have a big hug. After that, the Magic Windmill stops spinning for Tubby Bye-Bye. Featuring: The Children of Duncombe School, London
60	"Swans"	18 July 1997
The Teletubbies have trouble getting out of bed. The Teletubbies watch Andy Brown and some children feeding swans. It's time for Tubby Toast in Teletubbyland – but who's going to clean the crumbs of the Tubby Toast off the Tubby Table. The Noo-Noo tidies up the crumbs of the Tubby Toast before Tubby bye bye. Featuring: Andy Brown with Chelsea Henderson, Emily Fifield, Francome & Millie May
61	"Butterfly"	1 September 1997
The Teletubbies come down the slide, run outside for a Big Hug and fall down. Then the Magic Windmill Spins and so they watch some children look at Butterflies with Andy Brown. The Teletubbies fly their kites, Laa Laa goes to play with her Ball and gives her kite to Dipsy, he decides to play with Laa Laa and gives the kites to Tinky Winky, then the decides to play with them and gives he kites to Po and the strong wind blows Po all over Teletubbyland, she flies over the House, the other Teletubbies can't believe she's up in the sky, then she comes back down, she floats down into the hole at the top of the House and down the slide. The Teletubbies love Po very much. The Teletubbies do the Jumping Dance before Tubby Bye Bye. Featuring: Andy Brown with Giacomo Alger, Anil Jilka and Jodi Richards
62	"Carnival"	2 September 1997
In Teletubbyland, Tinky Winky is walking on a hill, Dipsy joins in too, Laa Laa joins in, and so as Po, they now say hello to the viewers. Then they rush off to watch Simone and Cacha make colourful costumes and then dance in a carnival. Then they do the Tip Toe Dance. Back in Teletubbyland, Laa Laa loves to play with her ball. Laa Laa bounced it so high. and back down. Laa Laa bounced the ball all the way to Po. Dipsy and then Tinky Winky, the ball now bounced in the Home Hill. The noo noo then sucked up Laa Laa's Ball, and then put it back outside to Laa Laa. Then the other Teletubbies hugged Laa Laa. Laa Laa loves her ball. Then they run off to the magical event of the Magic House with a singing puppet appearing in Teletubbyland until the Magic Windmill stops spinning for Tubby Bye Bye. Featuring: Simone Selandy and Sacha Ajim Raphael
63	"Naughty Snake"	3 September 1997
Tinky Winky, Dipsy and Laa-Laa run over a Hill to say Eh-Oh, but where's Po? Then they hear the Magic Windmill spinning and they go to watch a group of children watch Tamzin Griffin pretend to be Funny Lady and tell the story of the Naughty Snake. Then, inside the Superdome, It's Po's day for being naughty, she walks round and round the House very noisily, she goes up and down the slide too many times and runs in and out through the doors too many times, and Voice Trumpets describe her every move. But in the end, even though she was being naughty, the Teletubbies still love Po very much .The Teletubbies do the Round and Round dance before Tubby Bye-Bye. Featuring: Tamzin Griffin, The Children of Chater Infants School
64	"Guessing Game"	4 September 1997
The Teletubbies watch some children have fun playing a guessing game, then a book appears in Teletubbyland, and Laa-Laa loves to count the rabbits before Tubby Bye-Bye. Featuring: Chantal and Roxanne Blanning, Cassius Matthews
65	"Numbers – 4 (version 1)"	5 September 1997
Po comes into the House on her scooter and brings the other Teletubbies along with her. The Teletubbies watch some children learn about the number 4. In Teletubbyland a giant inflateable number 4 appears from far away, a Voice Trumpet sings " 1 2 3 4 sing a song of 4", the Teletubbies run away from the giant number 4, they spot four clouds, four flowers and four rabbits, the giant 4 appears and the Voice Trumpet sings making the Teletubbies run away, four running Teletubbies, the giant 4 disappears and the Magic Windmill stops spinning. The "Tubby Bye-Bye" sequence takes place. Featuring: The Children of Duncombe School, London
66	"Dandelion Clocks"	8 September 1997
Tinky Winky has fun jumping on a hill. The Teletubbies watch some children going for a walk to look for dandelion clocks to blow. Po decides to have a blowy day and blows the blankets off the Teletubbies beds, she blows their Tubby Toast away which Noo Noo tidies up and she blows the Teletubbies up the slide. The Teletubbies watch the Dancing Bear inside his stage before the Magic Windmill stops spinning and it is time for Tubby Bye Bye. Featuring: Kieran Gangaram, Sarah Hockley, Michael Johnson and Rachel Trew
67	"Ice Skating"	9 September 1997
Po spills her Tubby Custard on the floor and Tinky-Winky slips on it and slides around the house and up the slide, while the Noo Noo has to tidy up the mess, Tinky Winky comes back inside and his Tubby Apron/Bib is very messy, when he joins the other Teletubbies, he realizes there is no Tubby Custard in his bowl, so Dipsy kindly gives Tinky Winky some of his. The Teletubbies watch some children ice-skating. Tinky Winky and Po decide to hold hands, then Dipsy and Laa-Laa join in and then the Magic Windmill prepares to stop spinning, they said "Uh-Oh!", the Magic Windmill stops spinning and it is time for Tubby Bye Bye. Featuring: Adele Penny with Bradley Fernandes, Laura Highcock, Amy Morin, Vivian Parnell-Murphy, Shona Patel-Mehta, Ian Paterson and Nathalie Shepherd
68	"Josie's Pots"	10 September 1997
The Teletubbies watch two girls decorate a pot. Teletubbies love to play, but one by one their favourite things go missing. The Teletubbies run all over Teletubbyland to look for them. The Magic Windmill stops spinning and it was time for Tubby Bye-Bye. Featuring: Josie Caines and Georgina Murch
69	"Animals – Fish"	11 September 1997
The Teletubbies are relaxing. Then, they watch Andy Brown and some children examine a stream. Tinky Winky, Dipsy and Laa Laa are being quiet. Dipsy forgets to be quiet and eats his Tubby Toast too loud, but Tinky Winky and Laa Laa shhhh at him and he eats it more quietly, the Noo Noo is tidying up too loud, they shhhh at him and he stops. Po comes down the slide and plays with the levers, she is very noisy and the other Teletubbies shhh at her. She sneaks around to the other levers where the others can't see her, she pulls the levers and the other Teletubbies don't know where the noises are coming from. She pulls a lever and it makes the sound of a very loud Fire Engine and they all fall over, Po then shhhh's at them and they all have a Big Hug and one last shhhh. The Teletubbies do the Walking Dance before Tubby Bye-Bye. Featuring: Andy Brown with Naomi Crane, Rosa Roberts, Jem Roberts and Bethany Shepherd
70	"Hickory Dickory Dock"	12 September 1997
Five Voice Trumpets rise outside the House and they start making Ticking Noises the Teletubbies run outside to see, then the Windmill starts spinning. The Teletubbies watch some children dancing while King Pleasure and Biscuit Boys play Hickory Dickory Dock. Back in Teletubbyland, Po is making some adjustments and then Tinky Winky slides into the House. A voice trumpet appears and sings Hickory Dickory Dock. Tinky Winky and Po laugh as they act out the nursery rhyme. Tinky Winky pretends to be the Mouse and goes up the slide, Po pulls a lever and a Big Bell rings, then Tinky Winky comes back down. When the Voice Trumpet says ' The clock struck eight ' Po pulls the lever eight times and Tinky Winky goes up and down the slide eight times. Then the Magic Windmill starts to spin and the Teletubbies watch the Magic Tree before the Magic Windmill stops spinning as the "Tubby Bye-Bye" sequence takes place. Featuring: King Pleasure & The Biscuit Boys, The Pupils of Chuckery Infants School, Walsall
71	"Numbers – 6 (version 1)"	15 September 1997
The Teletubbies love playing Boo! Some children learn about the number six. Afterwards, Tinky Winky, Dipsy and Laa-Laa get their knees dirty and have fun getting them clean until Po comes in all dirty. Tinky Winky, Dipsy and Laa-Laa try to wash her, but she doesn't want to and runs around until Po gets her tubby sponge to wash herself when the others wash her. She is all clean and everyone is all clean too until the Magic Windmill stops spinning (offscreen) and it is time for Tubby Bye Bye. Featuring: The Children of Duncombe School, London
72	"Wake-Up"	16 September 1997
The Teletubbies have fun playing a game standing on a hill in different orders and calling out their names, then they watch some children playing a wake up game with Alex Pascall. Then the singing man in the pink house appears. The Teletubbies are asleep and play a waking up and sleeping game before Tubby bye bye. Featuring: Alex Pascall with Swayze Bieshton, Tyrone Francis, Josh Kellerman, Jee Su Kim, Bethanie Sadler and Dwayne Stewart
73	"Sophie - Art Circus"	17 September 1997
The Teletubbies slide inside the Home Hill and fall over, then they watch two children and Sophie paint a picture of a circus. Later, the Teletubbies head off to watch the Lion and Bear play hide and seek in Teletubbyland. The Teletubbies say "All gone!" and they laughed happily. Afterwards, the Magic Windmill prepares to stop spinning, and the Teletubbies say "Uh-Oh!" and run away in slow motion. The Magic Windmill then stops spinning before it's time for Tubby Bye Bye. Featuring: Sophie Herxheimer with Luke Guinness and Lola Milne
74	"Emily Washing The Pony"	18 September 1997
Laa-Laa had fun wearing Dipsy's hat. The Teletubbies watch Emily washing her pony, Jester. The Teletubbies wash themselves with their Tubby Sponges, a Voice Trumpet tells them to wash their hands, elbows, knees, feet and their tummies, the Teletubbies are all clean and the Magic Windmill spins, they say "Uh Oh!", the Magic Windmill stops spinning and it is time for Tubby Bye-Bye. Featuring: Nicole and Emily Kingman
75	"Gymnastics"	19 September 1997
The Teletubbies have fun creeping round the column in the Tubbytronic Superdome before watching some children doing gymnastics. Laa-Laa plays catch with the ball indoors with the other Teletubbies, but the Noo-Noo catches the ball first. Moments later, the Teletubbies give Noo-Noo a hug and then the Magic Windmill stops spinning and it is time for Tubby Bye-Bye. Featuring: The Children and Staff of Coventry Olympic Gym Club
76	"Sandcastles"	22 September 1997
The Teletubbies run round and round the House before the Magic Windmill spins, so they watch some children having fun building sandcastles. A Voice Trumpet rises and the Teletubbies go round and round all over Teletubbyland, the Beds, the Table and the outside and inside of the House. Then the Windmill spins and the Teletubbies watch The Tap Dancing Teddy Bear before the Magic Windmill stops spinning for Tubby Bye-Bye. Featuring: Thomas and Jack Armstrong
77	"Walking the Dog"	23 September 1997
Inside the Home Hill, Dipsy, Laa Laa and Po arrived inside the Home Hill, Tinky Winky is already inside eating his Tubby Toast. The windmill starts spinning and The Teletubbies runs out and watch two children take their dog for a walk. A voice trumpet appears and barks like a dog. The Teletubbies do a Round and Round dance before Tubby Bye Bye. Featuring: Clare Connor and Jessica Westwood
78	"Sand Pendulum"	24 September 1997
The Teletubbies enter their Tubbytronic Dome but then the Magic Windmill starts to spin and the Teletubbies watch three children filling up a soft drink bottle with black and white sand and the sand comes out all over the place. Tinky Winky, Dipsy and Laa Laa follow Po around Teletubbyland. The Windmill spins and the Teletubbies watch the Animal Parade before the Magic Windmill stops spinning and it is time for Tubby Bye Bye. Featuring: Sam Chivers, George Clark and Andrew Bloomfield
79	"Going on a Train"	25 September 1997
The Teletubbies slide down the slide couple times before the windmill spins and the Teletubbies run off to watch a video about a train ride. Po chases her scooter all over Teletubbyland but has a squeaky wheel. Featuring: Diko Blacklings, Jacqui and Eric Tombere, Hennie Van Der Berg and John Whitehill
80	"Herding Sheep"	26 September 1997
Some voice trumpets rise outside the House and make sheep noises. The Teletubbies watch Matthew, James and Mark herding sheep. The Teletubbies go in and out, and up and down, round the corner and along the top until it is time for tubby custard. The Voice Trumpet rises and the Teletubbies run outside to have Tubby Bye Bye. Featuring: Matthew, James and Mark Carnie
81	"Eid - New Clothes"	29 September 1997
The Teletubbies pop up and say; 'eh-oh!' before the Magic Windmill spins and the Teletubbies watch some children buying new clothes. A Mirror appears from far away, Laa Laa and Dipsy like looking at their reflections in the mirror, Tinky Winky wants to look at his reflection but he is too tall, so Dipsy tilts the Mirror up and down until Tinky Winky could see his reflection. Featuring: Kassim, Adil and Iram Aziz
82	"Picking and Sorting"	30 September 1997
Inside the Home Hill, Laa Laa's ball bounces inside the house, and suddenly, the Noo Noo tidies up her ball, then Laa Laa comes in the house. The Noo Noo eventually returns Laa Laa's ball to Laa Laa. Laa Laa is happy to have her ball again. Then the Magic Windmill starts spinning and Laa Laa runs out to join the other Teletubbies and they watch some girls spend the day picking and sorting vegetables in the garden. Tinky-Winky makes Tubby Toast for the other Teletubbies, but when he calls them, Noo-Noo tidies it all up. The Teletubbies chase him around the Home Hill. Po makes some more and the Teletubbies eat it very quickly. Featuring: Beverly, Samira, Elisha and Naomi Howe
83	"Numbers – 9"	1 October 1997
The Teletubbies pop up to say "Eh-Oh!" before they gather round to watch some children learn about the number nine. Po and Tinky Winky count nine flowers that appear in Teletubbyland and then run off to find Dipsy and Laa-Laa and dance the Bumping Dance before Tubby Bye-Bye. Featuring: The Children of Duncombe School, London
84	"Going to School By Boat"	2 October 1997
Noo Noo zooms around the house before the Teletubbies come to say Eh-Oh. The Teletubbies watch some children who live on the island then go to school by boat. Then a Voice Trumpet rises and the Teletubbies run back and forth over to some hills. Featuring: Sam and Blue Philpott
85	"Squirrels"	3 October 1997
The Noo-Noo makes a piece of Tubby Toast just as they Teletubbies walk in. Then the Teletubbies watch some people looking at squirrels. The Teletubbies play Hide and Seek. The Noo-Noo found the Teletubbies hidden under the Tubby Custard Machine. Naughty Noo-Noo! Then it is time for Tubby Bye Bye. Featuring: Andy Brown with Connor & Clarissa Clements and Jenny McAleavey
86	"Dry Stone Wall"	6 October 1997
The Teletubbies go up the slide to see two children mend a dry stone wall. A wall appears in Teletubbyland. Laa Laa, Po and Tinky Winky play a game with the wall. They hear Dipsy coming and hide behind the wall. Featuring: The Noble Family
87	"Urban Birds"	7 October 1997
Laa Laa plays with a ball until the Magic Windmill spins. The video is of Andy Brown and some children feed some birds and watch them playing on the bird table. In Teletubbyland, it's time for tubby custard, but Dipsy spills his Tubby Custard all over a tubby seat. No one wants to sit in the tubby custard, so Noo Noo tidies it up. Then the Magic Windmill stops spinning and then it is time for Tubby Bye Bye. Featuring: Andy Brown with Matthew & Lauren Goodsmith and Adam Lewis
88	"Bubble Pictures"	8 October 1997
The Teletubbies have all gone, then they pop over some hills and come to say Eh Oh, then the Magic Windmill starts spinning so The Teletubbies watch some children mix water, paint and washing-up liquid to make bubble pictures. Also, Po makes Tubby Custard. She then catches up with the other Teletubbies to watch The Three Ships sail around Teletubbyland and the Magic Windmill stops spinning. Featuring: The Children of St Bede's Prep School Nursery Department
89	"Good Morning"	9 October 1997
The Teletubbies finish their Tubby toast quickly and Laa-Laa receives a transmission of Alex Pascall and some children going for a walk and singing Good Morning to everyone that they meet. All the Teletubbies want to play with Dipsy, but Dipsy wants to dance. They all watch the roundabout and the Dancing Bear. The Magic Windmill then stops spinning and the Teletubbies do Tubby Bye Bye. Featuring: Alex Pascall with Maria Cook, Adrian Davis, Tyrone Francis, Jade Hazel, John Howe, C.A. Johnson, Josh Kellerman, Jee Su Kim, Laurence Lundgren, Keith More, Bethanie Sadler and Kyle Watson
90	"Numbers – 8"	10 October 1997
The Teletubbies walk around Hills and fall down, then the Teletubbies watch some children learning about the number "8". Then eight magic clouds appear in Teletubbyland, Laa-Laa bounces her ball eight times, Dipsy counts eight flowers and Tinky Winky does eight turns. The Animal Parade marches through Teletubbyland and the Magic Windmill stops spinning for Tubby Bye-Bye. Featuring: The Children of Duncombe School, London
91	"Monkey Safari"	13 October 1997
Each one of the Teletubbies have something special to do. Tinky Winky tries to jump along the path, Dipsy tries to walk around the house without stopping, Laa Laa tries to throw her up ball up as high as the clouds and Po tries to ride her scooter up to the top of a steep hill. Then they watch Andy Brown and some children going to a safari park to look at some monkeys and then the Tubby Bye-Bye sequence happens as the Teletubbies go home and the Sun sets. Featuring: Andy Brown with Charelle Handford, Oliver Hooper and Daniel Salmon
92	"Leaves"	14 October 1997
Inside the House, the Teletubbies make noisy footsteps, Po marches, Laa Laa jumps, Dipsy skips and Tinky Winky has Tubby Custard on his foot and Noo Noo tidies up. The Teletubbies watch some children play with Autumn Leaves. Back in Teletubbyland the Lion and Bear play their hiding game before the Magic Windmill stops spinning and it is time for Tubby Bye-Bye. Featuring: The Children of Jordans First School, Buckinghamshire
93	"Flamenco Guitar"	15 October 1997
Laa Laa and Dipsy bump into each other walking into the House, Tinky Winky walks inside and Po comes down the slide and knocks him over, all the Teletubbies bump into each other and fall over. The Teletubbies watch Ellie and Daisy play the Guitar with Tito. A Guitar appears from Far Away, Laa Laa decides to play the Guitar but she plays it very loud and out of tune, it makes Tinky Winky run away and the Flowers think it's dreadful. Laa Laa plays the Guitar so loud it swipes Dipsy's Hat off of his head, Po is riding her Scooter when Dipsy's Hat lands on her head, she knocks Laa Laa's Ball into the air and it Bounces past Dipsy and Laa Laa, all the Teletubbies Fall over and have a Big Hug. The Guitar then floats away into the Sky. The Tubby Bye Bye Voice Trumpet rises and the Teletubbies run away to do Tubby Bye Bye. Featuring: Tito Heredia, Ellie Greening and Daisy White
94	"Numbers – 1 (version 2)"	16 October 1997
The episode starts with the Teletubbies running out of their house saying "Eh-oh!". And they found their favorite things. Then the Magic Windmill Spins and the Teletubbies watch some children learning about the number 1. Inside the Home Hill, it is time for Teletubbies to sleep in their beds, and the voice trumpet rises up singing them a good to sleep song to the Teletubbies, After a moment later, Po is gone. For a second time, Laa Laa is gone after Po returns to the Home Hill. For a third time, Dipsy is gone after Laa Laa and Po is gone. For a fourth time, Tinky Winky is gone after Dipsy, Laa Laa and Po are gone. For the last time, All the Teletubbies are gone with their favorite things after the Tinky Winky, Dipsy, Laa Laa and Po returned in the Home Hill, they suddenly noticed that they left the Noo Noo back home, so he could tidy up their blankets (not shown). The narrator says that the Teletubbies are supposed to be in bed. Then, The Teletubbies run away because they don't want to be in their beds. Then The "Tubby Bye-Bye" Sequence takes place as the Teletubbies go home and the sun sets. Featuring: The Children of Duncombe School, London
95	"Stop and Go"	17 October 1997
The Teletubbies play a round and round game with a Voice Trumpet, then the Magic Windmill spins from the Start Spinning animation and the Teletubbies watch some children playing Stop and Go. The Teletubbies are giggling and they were playing a Ready Steady Go game by running, jumping, crawling and walking backwards They then played the Ready Steady Go game anyway they wanted to. Featuring: The Children and Staff of The African Caribbean Project, Leamington Spa
96	"Chinese New Year"	20 October 1997
The Teletubbies slide into Home Hill then they run off to see a parade celebrating Chinese New Year. A little boy shows them some dragons. A pink and blue tooter with a pink feather appears in Teletubbyland and Po blows it. When Laa Laa blows the tooter, the feather tickles Tinky Winky and when Tinky Winky blows it very hard, it knocks Dipsy's hat off and then tickles him. The Teletubbies have lots of fun with the tooter. Featuring: Chloe Chan, Tony Chu and Jonathan and Howard Ho
97	"Pancakes"	21 October 1997
Dipsy comes into the Tubbytronic Superdome wearing his hat but Noo-Noo sucks it up. The Teletubbies watch Daniel and Stephanie make big round pancakes. After the Teletubbies play a Round and Round game and go to bed, they are woken up by the Magic Windmill spinning. Then they watch the Tap Dancing Teddy Bear on his gazebo before doing the Round and Round dance before it is time for Tubby Bye Bye. Featuring: Kate Barber, Daniel Fenson, Helen & Stephanie Jarvis and Slawek Zyla
98	"Funghi the Dolphin"	22 October 1997
The Teletubbies appear one by one and they want Tubby Custard but the Magic Windmill starts spinning. The Teletubbies watch a video of Andy Brown and some children take a boat trip to find a dolphin. Tinky Winky and Po say "Eh-Oh!" to each other. Dipsy and Laa-Laa appear and say "Eh-Oh!". Laa-Laa says Bye Bye to the other Teletubbies and the Teletubbies do the same. Dipsy says Bye Bye to the other Teletubbies but he doesn't want to leave, so instead they all have a Big Hug. Featuring: Andy Brown with Paul Geaney, Gene O'Connor and Michelle O'Connell
99	"Music With Debbie 2"	23 October 1997
The Teletubbies were having fun running around and saying Eh-oh and hiding behind the bushes and trees and hills couple times, then the windmill starts spinning and the Teletubbies runs off and Po receives a video of some children doing music with Debbie, then Tinky Winky and Po were sitting outside on the hill, and they play "Two Little Teletubbies", Tinky Winky runs away first, then Po runs away next. Tinky Winky comes back. Po comes back. They decided to play again lots of times. Then it was time for Tubby Bye-Bye. Featuring: Debbie Ivens and The Crescendo Kids
100	"Mandir Temple"	24 October 1997
The Teletubbies visit a Mandir Temple, where children are celebrating the Diwali festival. The Teletubbies have a very busy day. They watch the clouds, smell the flowers, look for rabbits and run around the house, but they are still not tired. The Teletubbies run away to the Animal Parade. After the Animal Parade, the Magic Windmill stops spinning and the Teletubbies do Tubby Bye Bye. Featuring: Arvind, Elissa and Leah Patel
101	"Little Baby"	8 December 1997
The Teletubbies do a Twisty Dance. Tinky-Winky watches Alex Pascall sing "Little Baby" in a nursery. Tinky Winky, Dipsy, and Laa-Laa want to go for a walk, but Po is asleep, so, with some assistance from a nearby Voice Trumpet, the other Teletubbies try to wake her up by singing the Wake Up Po song. Featuring: Alex Pascall with Swayze Bieshton, Tyrone Francis, Josh Kellerman, Jee Su Kim, Bethanie Sadler and Dwayne Stewart
102	"How Things Swim"	9 December 1997
The Teletubbies run over to each other but the Magic Windmill spins and the Teletubbies then watch Andy Brown visiting an aquarium to learn how things swim in water, then they play an in-and-out game when a cloud appears in Teletubbyland. Featuring: Andy Brown with Paul Geaney, Gene O'Connor and Michelle O'Connell
103	"Naughty Horse Returns"	10 December 1997
Inside the Tubbytronic superdome, Tinky Winky and Dipsy are holding hands and bouncing up and down before the Magic Windmill spins and the Teletubbies watch a funny lady tells a story of the naughty horse returns. In Teletubbyland, Po is playing with Laa-Laa's ball and doesn't want to give it back until she sees her scooter. The Teletubbies watch the Magic Tree with before the Sun Baby giggles for Tubby Bye-Bye. Featuring: Tamzin Griffin with The Children of Chater Infants School, Watford
104	"Bell Ringing"	11 December 1997
The Teletubbies jump on a hill, they run down and back up the hill a few times before the Magic Windmill spins and the Teletubbies watch two children climb a church tower to watch their mums ring the church bells. Tinky Winky, Dipsy, Laa-Laa and Po each sing a special song into Tinky-Winky's bag, but when he drops it, their songs make a lovely new mixed up song. Featuring: Peter Davies and Sophie Greenwood
105	"Colours – Blue"	12 December 1997
It was time for tubby toast but the Noo-Noo had tidied up the Tubby Toast. After a chase they watch some children learn about the colour blue. Po watches the Blue sky, white clouds, grey clouds, rain, and blue puddles. A voice trumpet appears and sings Po the special song on blue, white and grey. Po sings also and the talking flowers sing too. She runs inside the Home Hill just as it rains. After the raining stopped, she found a puddle and sees her reflection in it. She then catches up with the Teletubbies to dance the Splashing Dance. Featuring: The Children of Oxhey Infants School, Watford
106	"Christening"	15 December 1997
The Noo-Noo tidies up the Tubbytronic Superdome before the Teletubbies go up the slide to watch Natalie talk about her brother's christening. A magical flower cloud also appears in Teletubbyland. It rains on Tinky-Winky's bag, Laa-Laa's ball, Po's scooter, and Dipsy's hat. But Dipsy didn't like it, so he ran away. It is time for Tubby Bye-Bye. Featuring: Natalie and Christopher Boughton
107	"Feeding the Sheep in Winter"	16 December 1997
The Teletubbies walk around and round some trees, the Magic Windmill starts spinning and they watch some children feeding their sheep in winter time. Inside the House, the Teletubbies wake up, Tinky Winky wants Tubby Custard but Po wants Tubby Toast, the other Teletubbies can't decide what to eat. So instead they go outside and do the Bumping Dance. Featuring: Andy Brown with Sarah and Mark Robertson
108	"Hanukkah"	17 December 1997
The Teletubbies looked for their favourite things. Then, they watch a video of boys playing with their spinning tops in the celebration of Hanukkah. (Shimon Goodhardt) Tinky Winky does a "Round and Round Dance" but his skirt comes off every time he dances around the door and trees. Then, the Noo-Noo sucked it inside and tossed it onto his head. Dipsy, Laa-Laa and Po watched Tinky Winky's dance. Finally, they rushed to see The Tap Dancing Teddy Bear inside his carousel before the Sun Baby giggles for Tubby Bye-Bye. Featuring: Shimmy, Aron and Eli Goodhardt
109	"Washing Up"	18 December 1997
The Teletubbies do a Jumping Dance on the path, when Tinky Winky rolls away, he then sneaks up behind the other Teletubbies and says 'Eh-oh'. The Windmill starts spinning and the Teletubbies watch Yvette wash up her plastic cups and saucers. The Teletubbies have a very messy day, they all leave their Tubby Beds in a mess, Tinky Winky and Dipsy make a mess at the Tubby Custard Machine, Laa Laa and Po make a mess at the Tubby Table, so Noo Noo tidies up. The Teletubbies love the Noo Noo. Featuring: Yvette and Kim Dixon-Tetteh
110	"Numbers – 5 (version 2)"	19 December 1997
The Teletubbies are asleep, but Noo-Noo tidies up their blankets. They stop chasing him to watch some children learn about the number five. A flashing light appears in Teletubbyland. Then they go to see The Magic Tree then The Magic Windmill Stops Spinning Then The Tubby Bye-Bye Senquence Takes. Featuring: The Children of Duncombe School, London
111	"Christmas Tree"	22 December 1997
The Teletubbies listen to a voice trumpet saying "Christmas is a coming" and watch as some children select a Christmas tree and decorate it. Then the Teletubbies learn about Christmas when a Christmas tree magically appears in Teletubbyland. And four presents appear on the tree, one for each Teletubby. Now the Teletubbies have their own Christmas presents and were very happy. Featuring: Lewis Evans, Elliott and Jazzmin Fairhurst-Groethe and Anne-Marie Tuckwell
112	"Making Christmas Cards"	23 December 1997
The Teletubbies watch some children making Christmas cards. A Christmas present for Laa-Laa has lovely decorations. Laa-Laa is very pleased with her present. She decides to show Tinky Winky, Dipsy and Po when they get inside the house and see her. Then the Noo-Noo tidies them up and wants to decorate the house, but the Teletubbies scold him saying "Naughty Noo-Noo". The decorations tickles the Noo-Noo's inside part, so he blows them out, firing up and acting like a jet engine to decorate Home Hill just like he wanted to! The Teletubbies think it was so festive and say "Clever Noo-Noo". Featuring: Naomi Adeniji, Desmond, Ella & Lilly Ainsworth and Saalim Koomar
113	"Crackers"	24 December 1997
The Teletubbies listen to a Voice Trumpet say 'Twas the Night before Christmas and all through the House, not a creature was stirring not even a Mouse'. The Teletubbies watch two children who are making Christmas crackers for each other. Dipsy is very pleased to find his present is a cracker. He looks for the other Teletubbies to pull the cracker with, and when they do it makes a lovely pink bang. What's inside was a pink and purple drum (which is not seen again at the end of the activity). The Teletubbies fall backwards, Tinky Winky and Po fall backwards into the House and Dipsy and Laa Laa fall backwards into a Tree, then they all have a Big Hug. Featuring: Nadia Khan and Sam Whittaker
114	"Christmas Carols"	25 December 1997
It's Christmas, and a group of children sing some Christmas carols to the Teletubbies. Tinky Winky opens his present to find a beautiful star inside, which the Teletubbies follow all over Teletubbyland. Where will it end up? Featuring: The Children of St Charles Primary School, Gosforth
115	"Snowy Story"	26 December 1997
Two voice trumpets sing to the Teletubbies a duet version of a winter nursery rhyme called "The North Wind Doth Blow", and then they watch some children building a snowman. Back in Teletubbyland, Po receives a present, so she puts it on the back side of her scooter and starts to run, but when she arrives at the trees (same trees from the Lion and Bear), her present falls off. However, the present is soon found by Laa-Laa who gives it back to Po. Po is really happy to have her present back. Then she heard a noise coming from her present and decides to open it. Po's present is a little frosty cloud that begins to snow. All the Teletubbies laugh as they play in the snow before the Magic Windmill spins; the Teletubbies say 'Uh-oh!', and the Magic Windmill stops spinning, and it is time for Tubby Bye Bye. Featuring: The Children of Hunter Mountain
116	"Level Crossing"	29 December 1997
The Teletubbies are running around the house, then suddenly, the Magic Windmill spins, so they go off to watch some children visit a level crossing at Caersws, Wales and watch a train passing by. The Teletubbies play their Ready, Steady Go game, then they go and watch the Animal Parade march through Teletubbyland, the Teletubbies do the Walking Dance before Tubby Bye-Bye. Featuring: Amy & Mark Mason and The Fallows Family
117	"Becky and Jed Finding Eggs"	30 December 1997
The Teletubbies are sliding down the slide before watching Becky and her brother Jed find eggs at a farm. Later, they watch the Lion and Bear play hide and seek in Teletubbyland. Afterwards, the Teletubbies do the Running Away dance before Tubby Bye-Bye. Featuring: Jed Clemmett, Becky Murray and Anne-Marie Walker
118	"Rocking Chair"	31 December 1997
Inside the Superdome, the Teletubbies go down the slide one at the time and they say hello, in front of the table. Then, the Magic Windmill starts spinning and the Teletubbies watch Alex Pascall and some children singing to their dolls to rock them to sleep. Laa Laa wants to sing a lovely song to Dipsy and Po, but Tinky-Winky is eating his Tubby Toast too loudly. The Magic Windmill starts to spin and the Teletubbies are woken up. Then the Magic Windmill stops spinning and it is time for Tubby Bye-Bye. Featuring: Alex Pascall, The Children of Earlsfield Primary School's Reception Class

=== Season 2 (1998) ===
No.	Title	Original release date
119	"Colours – Pink"	1 January 1998
The Teletubbies march up and down the hill and then they watch some children explore the colour pink. Po makes Tubby Custard which is pink too. She gets a Tubby Custard bowl, uses a Tubby Custard tap and turns on the Tubby Custard and the Tubby Cusard enter her bowl. Finally, when Po gets a bowl of Tubby Custard, she sees and hears Tinky-Winky coming around her. She shows him her bowl of Tubby Custard. Tinky Winky wants some Tubby Custard too, but he doesn't know how to make it. When Po tells him he needs a bowl, Tinky Winky gets it too but accidentally makes a mess around Home Hill. She was so surprised when he was accidentally spreading Tubby Custard all over her. He accidentally spreads it on the Noo-Noo as well. Just then, Laa-Laa comes in to play with her ball when she sees Tubby Custard splattering all over her ball. The Noo-Noo tidies up the mess and around himself, too. Teletubbies give him a big hug before the Pink Tubby Custard Spots segment is over. Featuring: The Children of Oxhey Infants School, Watford
120	"Living in Flats"	2 January 1998
Laa-Laa dances with her ball and the Teletubbies watch a boy describing why he likes to live in flats. A balloon appears in Teletubbyland and the Teletubbies follow it around until Po catches it and they all take turns to hold it. After they have their turns, all the Teletubbies wanted to hold the balloon, but they let go of it and it flies away into the sky. Featuring: Alan Henderson, Sharon and Ramone Moody
121	"Urban Walk"	5 January 1998
The Teletubbies play their Through the Arch game. But the Windmill interrupts them, so they go off to watch a little girl and her dad go for a walk. A traffic light appears in Teletubbyland and Po admires the traffic lights changing and has to wait for the traffic lights to change to green. Then Dipsy who's wearing his hat arrives only to have to wait for the traffic lights to change to green. Laa Laa comes along with her ball and wants Dipsy to play with it. Tinky Winky comes along with his handbag and he wants to walk on the red light but can't and has to wait. The light turns green and the teletubbies go and then the traffic lights disappear. Featuring: Ellie, Trixie and Kevin Greening
122	"Our Calf Treacle"	6 January 1998
The Teletubbies are at the top of a hill and they say their names. They then run down the hill and run up a hill. Next, they run up the hill. The Magic Windmill spins and the Teletubbies watch Mark and Matthew feed a baby calf. Then they play a game to see who can eat their Tubby Custard the slowest, but Po can't wait and eats hers very fast. Featuring: Matthew & Mark Carnie
123	"Naughty Pig"	7 January 1998
The Noo Noo tidies up while Teletubbies come in the back entrance house saying hello. Just then, the Magic Windmill starts spinning and they run out the back door and they watch Tamzin Griffin pretends to be Funny Lady and tells the story of the naughty pig. Also, the wind blows off Dipsy's Hat. The Magic Tree appears in Teletubbyland before the Sun Baby giggles for Tubby Bye-Bye. Featuring: Tamzin Griffin with The Children of Chater Infants School, Watford
124	"Washing the Car"	8 January 1998
Tinky Winky, Dipsy, and Laa-Laa walk into the TubbyTronic Superdome, while Po zooms in on her scooter catching up with them. The Teletubbies watch Shannon, Nicolas, Cameron and their Dad wash the family car. The Teletubbies wash themselves with "Tubby Sponges," in which each Teletubby has a Tubby wash and Noo-Noo gets a Tubby wash. Then the Magic Windmill stops spinning. The "Tubby Bye-Bye" sequence takes place and The Baby Sun sets. Featuring: Cameron and Shannon Patterson
125	"Handy Hands"	9 January 1998
The Teletubbies crawl the arch in Home Hill and they go and watch Alex Pascall and some children sing handy hands. A pair of mittens appear in Teletubbyland, and Tinky Winky does a special dance wearing them. Next, Po wears the mittens, and she does a special dance too. Featuring: Alex Pascall, The Children of Earlsfield Primary School, London
126	"Playing Ball"	12 January 1998
The Teletubbies slide down the slide in the Home Hill and they fell down happily, then The Magic Windmill starts spinning and they run out and they watch some children play with balls of different shapes and sizes. In Teletubbyland, something happens to Dipsy's hat. One moment it is too small, then it grows too big. Dipsy is very surprised when the other Tubbies tell him his hat is the wrong size. Featuring: Patrick Carvey, Henry Crossman, Marshall Ingham, Freya Knibb, Matthew Paine, Amelia Paul, Olivia Phelps, Katie & Georgina Phillipps, Candisha & Kyishas Thompson and James Turner
127	"Irish Dancing"	13 January 1998
In the Home Hill, the voice trumpet rises while the Teletubbies eat Tubby Toast. When they are finished eating, they do exercises in the Home Hill. When they are tired out, they shout "Run away, run away!" before they rush outside to watch a video about a little girl named Becky doing Irish Dancing. Later, the Teletubbies go up to the path to do the Jumping Dance. Then The Magic Windmill starts to spin and the Teletubbies rush off to see the Magical Event of the Bear and Lion playing their hide and seek game in Teletubbyland. The Magic Windmill stops spinning. The "Tubby Bye-Bye" sequence then takes place and The Baby Sun sets in the sky. Featuring: The Dancers of Bennett's End Community Centre, Hemel Hempstead
128	"Numbers – 2 (version 2)"	13 January 1998
The Teletubbies listen to a voice trumpet recite the nursery rhyme "Two Little Dickie Birds" before watching some children learning about number 2. Dipsy and Laa-Laa are eating Tubby Toast when they decide to play a game called "Two Little Teletubbies", but the Noo-Noo tidies up the Tubby Toast while they are playing. The Teletubbies chase him around the house before the voice trumpet rises for Tubby Bye Bye. Featuring: The Children of Duncombe School, London
129	"Giraffes"	15 January 1998
The Teletubbies take turns standing on a Hill, in front of the House, in front of a Tree and under a Cloud, then they all have Tubby Toast before the Windmill spins. The Teletubbies watch Andy Brown and the children visit some giraffes. The Teletubbies watch The Animal Parade before the Sun Baby giggles for Tubby Bye Bye. Featuring: Andy Brown with Charelle Handford, Oliver Hooper and Daniel Salmon
130	"Amy's Pasta"	16 January 1998
The Teletubbies are eating their tubby toast. They stop to watch Amy, her dad and her friend, Georgia making pasta. A ball of string appears in Teletubbyland. Po accidentally knocks the string into the air with her scooter and it makes a stringy mess all over Teletubbyland, but clever Noo Noo tidies up. Featuring: Georgia Habboo and The Esposito Family
131	"Naughty Sock Returns"	23 March 1998
Tinky Winky calls the other Teletubbies to come and watch Tamzin Griffin pretend to be Funny Lady, and tell another story about the Naughty Sock. The Teletubbies wake up when it's time for Tubby Toast. The Tubby Toast Machine makes a tower of tubby toast. Laa Laa, Dipsy and Tinky Winky can't reach the top of the tower, so Po decides that she wanted the furthest piece. So she pulled the piece and the tower fell down. Now everybody can reach the Tubby Toast. The Teletubbies eat the tubby toast before the Magic Windmill spins. And then they watch the Singing Puppet Man in the Pink House before the Magic Windmill stops spinning and it is time for Tubby Bye-Bye. Featuring: Tamzin Griffin with The Children of Chater Infants School, Watford
132	"Penguins"	24 March 1998
The Noo Noo zooms around inside the Home Hill couple times before the Teletubbies come inside the front entrance to say hello to the viewers. Just afterwards, the Magic Windmill begins to spin and the Teletubbies run off and they watch some penguins waddling and swimming. In Teletubbyland, the Teletubbies walk in different ways until the Magic Windmill stops spinning (offscreen) and it was time for Tubby Bye Bye. Featuring: Hannah MacKay, Alex, Jess & Jo Osborne and Catherine Watkins
133	"Ned's Geraniums"	25 March 1998
The Teletubbies play "Boo" in the House. The Windmill spins and the Teletubbies watch Ned picking some Geraniums. Dipsy and Laa-Laa see nine pretty flowers appear in Teletubbyland, a watering can appears, Dipsy and Laa-Laa want to water the flowers but they drop the watering can and it's now empty, then a cloud appears and rains on the flowers, then the Teletubbies do the splashing dance. Featuring: Ned and Nigel Frost
134	"Digging in the Sand for Crabs"	26 March 1998
The video is about digging for crabs and the Teletubbies are walking sideways. The magical event of the three ships features then the Magic Windmill stops spinning and it is time for Tubby Bye-Bye. Featuring: Andy Brown with Emily Fifield and Millie & Francome May
135	"Samira's Gymnastics"	27 March 1998
In Teletubbyland, the Teletubbies walked to in front of the trees to say hello to the viewers. Then the Windmill begins to spin and they run to watch kids doing gymnastics with Samira. Then back in Teletubbyland, the Teletubbies does some exercises before Tubby Bye-Bye. Featuring: The Children and Staff of Coventry Olympic Gym Club, Coventry
136	"Milking Cows"	30 March 1998
Po is out for a ride on her Scooter. The Teletubbies watch James and Matthew help their uncle Mark milk the cows . It's Time for Tubby Custard, but the Tubby Custard Machine won't work, so the Teletubbies decide to sing a special Tubby Custard song, the Tubby Custard Machine makes some Tubby Custard Music, the Teletubbies try to make Tubby Custard and the Tubby Custard Machine is working again. Featuring: Matthew and James Carnie
137	"Flamenco Dancing"	31 March 1998
The Teletubbies are washing themselves with their Tubby Sponges when they listen to a Voice Trumpet play some Spanish music . Then they watch two children doing some Flamenco dancing lessons Again Again. The Teletubbies wash their feet with their Tubby Sponges, Tinky Winky washes his feet first, then Po and then Dipsy and Laa Laa wash each others feet. Featuring: Tito Heredia and Maribel La Manchega, Ellie Greening and Daisy White
138	"Cafe Eggs"	1 April 1998
The Teletubbies do the Tip Toe Dance before watching a little boy peel eggs, leaving eggshells in the eggs, He then mashes the eggs, and adds mayonnaise and then adds bread, then serves it to customers. The Teletubbies make Tubby Custard and they make musical slurping noises while they eat it. Then the Windmill starts spinning and they watch the Dancing Bear and then the Magic Windmill stops spinning and the "Tubby Bye-Bye" sequence takes place. Featuring: Obadiah Winter and Sandy Simmonds
139	"Drumming With Norris"	2 April 1998
The Teletubbies watch some children drum with their friend Norris. Tinky Winky dances on top of the House which wakes up the other Teletubbies, then they all decide to dance, the Windmill starts spinning and they watch The Three Ships before the Windmill stops spinning for Tubby Bye-Bye. Featuring: Norris Johnson, Pa Hasum Conteh, Masha Floris and Ivana Alana Haggar
140	"Making Fantastic Animals"	3 April 1998
Dipsy is out for a walk before the Windmill starts to spin.The Teletubbies watch children make animals from papier mache. A Little Lamb on red wheels appears from Far Away, Laa Laa thinks that the Little Lamb is sad so she decides to do a dance to cheer it up, but the Little Lamb is still sad. Tinky Winky brings the Little Lamb to the Flowers, Dipsy lets the Little Lamb wear his Hat and Po lets it ride her Scooter, but the Little Lamb is still sad until the Teletubbies hear a noise. Another Little Lamb appears and the Little Lamb is Happy and so are the Teletubbies, then both Lambs leave Teletubbyland and it's time for Tubby Bye Bye. Featuring: Mia Heath, Joe Scott and Rowan Smith
141	"Feeding the Monkeys"	6 April 1998
The Teletubbies pop over a Hill to say Eh Oh. Then they watch Georgina and her mother feeding Monkeys at the Zoo. Tinky Winky makes Tubby Toast, but the Tubby Toaster makes an extra piece, so Tinky Winky gives the extra piece to Po, but then Noo Noo tidies up the Tubby Toast so they chase him around the House. Then the Windmill starts spinning and the Animal Parade marches through Teletubbyland before the baby sun giggles for Tubby bye bye. Featuring: Carol and Georgina Day
142	"Naughty Hat"	7 April 1998
In Teletubbyland, Tinky Winky walks with his bag in front of the trees saying hello to the viewers. Just then, the Magic Windmill starts spinning and Tinky Winky joins the other Teletubbies and they watch Tamzin Griffin pretends to be the Funny Lady and tells the story of the Naughty Hat. The Teletubbies are very happy when they find their favorite things to play with. Featuring: Tamzin Griffin with The Children of Chater Infants School, Watford
143	"Gingerbread Boy"	8 April 1998
The Teletubbies are trying to be quiet, and the Teletubbies watch Oscar read the story of the "Gingerbread Boy" to his brother Felix. A voice trumpet appears and sings a nursery rhyme and the Teletubbies run all over Teletubbyland. Featuring: Oscar and Felix Taylor
144	"Looking for Rabbits"	9 April 1998
Po comes in the Home Hill and says hello. She catches the Tubbies and said hello. Then she receives a video and they watch Jack and Francesca looking for Rabbits with Andy. In Teletubbyland, Tinky Winky looks for Po everywhere, but she is hiding from him. When he finds her all the Tubbies dance a Happy Dance. Featuring: Andy Brown with Francesca Rutherford & Jack Western
145	"Painting Easter Eggs"	10 April 1998
The Teletubbies dance an up-and-down dance. They go off to watch some children painting pictures and patterns on eggs. Laa-Laa dances with her skirt and her ball. She rushes off to fetch the Teletubbies to watch The Magic Tree as it appears in Teletubbyland with five doves. The Magic Windmill stops spinning and it is time for Tubby Bye Bye. Featuring: Jean-Rene Badrick, Rachel Cann, Daniel & Rachel Goldberg, Alice Greenwood, Talbah Khan and Finbar Lenahan
146	"Finding Chocolate Eggs"	13 April 1998
Tinky Winky, Dipsy and Laa-Laa make some Tubby Custard, but there is none left for Po when she arrives, so she takes Laa-Laa's but then Laa-Laa takes it back, then Tinky Winky take Dipsy's but he takes it back off him, then all of the Teletubbies are taking each other's Tubby Custard. The Teletubbies tell Po to make her own Tubby Custard, but she doesn't want to, so she rides her scooter instead while the others have their Tubby Custard. The Teletubbies watch a video of some children going on an Easter egg hunt. The Teletubbies do the Falling Down Dance before Tubby Bye-Bye. Featuring: Alice & Samuel Dwyer, Max & Lucas Geddes, Rachel Horton, Casper Hughes, Eleanor Paine, Georgina & Katie Phillipps and Nikita Roberts
147	"Turban"	14 April 1998
Laa-Laa walks past rabbits and says 'Eh-oh!' before the Magic Windmill spins and the Teletubbies find out how to make a turban. The Teletubbies went for a walk together so they linked arms and walked together. Po saw her scooter and she wanted to ride her scooter whilst the other Teletubbies went for a walk together but they pulled the other way and all fell down. Po rode her scooter and the other Teletubbies went for a walk together. Laa-Laa saw her ball and Tinky Winky and Dipsy wanted to go for a walk so Tinky Winky, Dipsy and Laa-Laa fell down. Laa-Laa played with her ball. Tinky Winky and Dipsy went for a walk together. Dipsy saw his hat and wanted to wear his hat but Tinky Winky wanted to go for a walk. Dipsy wore his hat and he sung his hat song. Tinky Winky went for a walk on his own before the Sun Baby giggles for Tubby Bye Bye. Featuring: Jasjort Singh
148	"My Dad's a Tram Driver"	15 April 1998
The Teletubbies listen to a Voice Trumpet recite a nursery rhyme called "Hark, Hark, The Dogs Do Bark", then they watch Becky go for a ride on a tram. Po's scooter is involved in an accident and the other Teletubbies are knocked down. There's time for the Twisty Dance before Tubby Bye-Bye. Featuring: Rebecca Singer
149	"Football"	16 April 1998
Po eats some Tubby Custard and then runs off to see some children playing football (soccer in America) in the park. Laa-Laa and Po love playing with the ball. While they play, they sing about the ball. The magical house with four windows appears in Teletubbyland and the Magic Windmill stops spinning. It is time for Tubby Bye-Bye. Featuring: Ayende & Yusef Ali, Lorenzo Black, Foluke Cole, Malcolm & Ashleigh Sawyers and Thomas Wilson
150	"Naughty Sausage"	17 April 1998
The Teletubbies pop up from behind a hill to watch Tamzin Griffin pretend to be the Funny Lady. Laa Laa decides to dance a secret dance after receiving a naughty sausage transmission. Every time the others return, Laa Laa pretends to be asleep. Featuring: Tamzin Griffin with The Children of Chater Infants School, Watford
151	"Animals – Snails"	27 April 1998
Po sleeps in Tinky Winky's bed and Tinky Winky has nowhere to sleep. He tries sleeping in Po's bed, at the table and on the slide but he cannot get comfortable, Po then wakes up and Tinky Winky sleeps in his bed. The Windmill starts spinning and the Teletubbies run outside to watch Andy Brown show some children some Snails.The Teletubbies dance a Conga before Tubby Bye Bye. Featuring: Andy Brown with Giacomo Alger, Anil Jilka and Jodi Richards
152	"Numbers – 3 (version 2)"	28 April 1998
Tinky-Winky, Dipsy and Laa Laa march. Then they watch children learn the number 3. And then, three Teletubbies find three flowers and three trees. And they have Tubby Toast, but there are four pieces of Tubby Toast. Po comes to the house and haves the other tubby toast and it is time for Tubby Bye-Bye. Featuring: The Children of Duncombe School, London
153	"Dentist"	29 April 1998
Inside the Home Hill, the Teletubbies are sleeping when a voice trumpet rises and starts singing Frere Jacques in French to them. Then they wake up to see the Magic Windmill spinning. They rush outside (before the voice trumpet goes down) and watch a video about dentists working on some teeth and become fascinated by their own. Then, the Teletubbies rush off to see the Bear and the Lion play hide and seek before the Magic Windmill stops spinning for Tubby Bye Bye. Featuring: Reena Aluwhalia and The Armstrong Family
154	"Making Salad"	30 April 1998
The Teletubbies are trying to eat their Tubby Toast but the Noo Noo is being too noisy zooming around the House. The Teletubbies watch Yvette and her brother Leslie making salad. Back in Teletubbyland the Teletubbies try to have their Tubby Custard but they all keep falling over.Then they run outside to do the Falling Down Dance before Tubby Bye-Bye. Featuring: Yvette and Leslie Dixon-Tetteh
155	"Making Lanterns"	1 May 1998
The Teletubbies are feeling very happy so they all jump around a tree, Laa-Laa jumps away and Dipsy goes to Hide. Tinky-Winky and Po run around Teletubbyland, but soon Tinky Winky runs away leaving Po on her own. She falls down, lies in the Sun and then rolls away. The Magic Windmill starts to spin and the Teletubbies watch two Boys and their uncle making Lanterns. It's time for Tubby Toast. Laa-Laa's piece of Tubby Toast landed on top of her head and gets stuck in her aerial, the other three Teletubbies start laughing because she doesn't know where her Tubby Toast has gone and Po puts it back On The table. Then they watch the Magical Event with the Magic Tree with five doves. Then they have the Stamping and Stepping Dance before Tubby Bye-Bye just as The Baby Sun sets. Featuring: Jonathan and Howard Ho
156	"Colours – Green"	4 May 1998
Inside the House the Teletubbies listen to a Voice Trumpet make a "MOOOOOOO" Noise which they find very funny. Then they watch a video about the Colour green. Laa Laa loves the Green Grass. Po loves the Green Trees. Tinky Winky loves the Green House and the Teletubbies love Green Dipsy. The Teletubbies do the Round and Round Dance before Tubby Bye Bye. Featuring: The Children of Oxhey Infants School, Watford
157	"Our Dog Alice"	5 May 1998
The Teletubbies watch Ella and Lilly discuss about their pet dog Alice and they go for a walk in the park . A barking dog appears in Teletubbyland, Dipsy is scared until he realises that it is just being friendly. Tinky Winky and Dipsy pat the dog! The dog then disappears and Tinky Winky and Dipsy walk away. Featuring: Ella and Lilly Ainsworth
158	"Tulips"	6 May 1998
A balloon appears from Far Away, Laa Laa tries to catch it but she can't, Tinky Winky tries but he can't either, the balloon floats around the House, Dipsy walks out and finds it, he tries to catch it but he can't, even Po tries but she can't, none of the Teletubbies can catch the balloon and it floats away. The Windmill starts spinning and the Teletubbies watch two girls picking Tulips. The Teletubbies do the Jumping Dance (on the path) before Tubby Bye Bye. Featuring: Hannah Pettit and Christina Tyrrell
159	"Sea Lions"	7 May 1998
Po is out for a walk around Teletubbyland, then the Magic Windmill spins, then the Teletubbies watch Andy Brown and some children watch some Sea Lions. Inside the house, the Teletubbies play with the Control Panel, until the Magic Windmill spins, the Dancing Bear appears in a merry-go-round, the Teletubbies do The Tip Toe Dance before Tubby Bye-Bye. Featuring: Andy Brown with Cherelle Handford, Oliver Hooper and Daniel Salmon
160	"Statues"	8 May 1998
The Teletubbies play a Hiding Game inside the House. Tinky Winky, Laa-Laa and Po Hide from Dipsy. Laa-Laa hides between the Beds, Po hides under the Arch, and Tinky Winky hides behind the Tubby Toaster. When Dipsy looks for the other Teletubbies he can't find them, but when Noo Noo tidies up he finds the other Teletubbies, then Dipsy finds them. The Teletubbies watch some children play Statues. The Teletubbies do the Tip Toe Dance before Tubby Bye Bye. Featuring: Nathaniel Facey, Shantelle Hamilton, Saj Musa and Kelly Phillips
161	"Cygnets"	11 May 1998
The Teletubbies watch Andy Brown and some children visit some cygnets. In Teletubbyland, it is time for bed, but Po is not tired and doesn't want to go to sleep yet so she has to ride her scooter. Then, it was time for Tubby Toast, but Po was too tired to eat her piece of toast, so she tries to take a nap and falls asleep.the Magic Windmill then wakes the Teletubbies up and eventually, it stops spinning as the Tubby Bye-Bye Sequence takes place. Featuring: Andy Brown with Sophie Easton and Ryan McKechnie
162	"Rollerblading"	12 May 1998
The Teletubbies dance a Twisty Dance, then they watch two children rollerblading in New York. The Noo Noo tidies up Tinkly Winky's Tubby Toast so Tinky Winky chases him round Home Hill. The Animal Parade march through Teletubbyland. The Magic Windmill stops spinning and it is time for Tubby Bye-Bye. Featuring: Zelda Gay and Mardet Homans
163	"Naughty Duck"	13 May 1998
The Teletubbies watch Tamzin Griffin pretend to be the Funny Lady and tell the story of the naughty duck, Laa-Laa and Po make some adjustments on the switch panel and it's time for the Bumping dance before Tubby Bye-Bye. Featuring: Tamzin Griffin with The Children of Chater Infants School, Watford
164	"Ice Cream Sundae"	14 May 1998
A Magic Watering Can appears from Far Away, Po water's some flowers that grow enormous. Po decides to water the other Teletubbies Favourite Things and they become enormous. Laa Laa loves her enormous Ball, Tinky Winky loves his enormous Bag and Dipsy loves his enormous Hat. The Teletubbies watch two children making Ice Cream Sundaes. The Teletubbies do the Splashing Dance before Tubby Bye Bye. Featuring: Alessandro Rasulo and Rebecca Thomas
165	"Playing With Dough"	15 May 1998
The Teletubbies love to run around and around Teletubbyland, but stop to watch three children make some Play-Doh. The Tubby Toaster makes a big piece of Tubby Toast. Laa-Laa, Dipsy and Tinky Winky think it's too big, but Po doesn't. She eats it all. The Teletubbies watch the Magic Tree. Afterwards, the Magic Windmill stops spinning and it is time for Tubby Bye-Bye. Featuring: Augustus Betz, Leia Kennedy and Duncan MacKinnon
166	"Kite Flying"	18 May 1998
The Teletubbies run out of the house to find their favorite things, then they run off to watch some children flying kites. A special cloud falls out of the sky and lands on Tinky Winky's head. Tinky Winky shows his special cloud to the others and they all think it is beautiful. But when he shows it to Dipsy the special cloud lifts off his head and floats back into the sky. Tinky Winky is sad until Dipsy let him wear his hat to cheer him up. Featuring: Kieran Gangaram, Michael Johnson and Rachel Trew
167	"Ballet Rhymes" "Ballet Rhymes 3"	19 May 1998
The Teletubbies love to dance. The Tubbies dance a happy dance and then watch some children perform in a ballet show. Dipsy dances in his bed and Laa-Laa dances whilst making tubby custard. Tinky-Winky and Po dance a ballroom dance and then all the Teletubbies dance together. Featuring: The Children of The Heidi Rhodes School of Dance
168	"Numbers – 4 (version 2)"	20 May 1998
The Teletubbies say Eh-Oh, then The Teletubbies watch some children learn about the number 4. In Teletubbyland The Teletubbies have Tubby custard and then play the game "Who's in the House?", Po leaves, then Laa-Laa, then Dipsy, then Tinky-Winky, leaving Noo-Noo all alone, then the Magic Windmill spins so the Teletubbies watch the Magic House before the Magic Windmill stops spinning and then it's Tubby Bye-Bye. Featuring: The Children of Duncombe School, London
169	"Haircut"	21 May 1998
The Teletubbies watch two boys having their hair cut. A mirror appears in Teletubbyland. Laa-Laa, Dipsy and Tinky Winky like looking at their reflection in the mirror. Po liked looking at her reflection in the mirror, but not as much as she liked to ride her scooter. The Tap Dancing Teddy Bear appears also in his gazebo. Afterwards, the Magic Windmill stops spinning and it is time for Tubby Bye Bye. Featuring: Oliver Brookes and Thomas MacLean
170	"Carnival II"	22 May 1998
The Teletubbies sing songs about their favourite things and Po sings a song about a cloud, which then begins to rain. The Windmill starts spinning and the Teletubbies watch a video about a Carnival. Then they do The Follow The Leader Dance inside the Home Hill, before it's time for Tubby-Bye-Bye. Featuring: Children from The Mahogany Group, Notting Hill Carnival
171	"Tennis"	22 June 1998
The Teletubbies run across the hills to say "Eh-Oh" and watch some children playing tennis. Laa-Laa and Po love to play with the ball. They roll, throw and kick it to each other, the Teletubbies dance the Round and Round Dance before Tubby Bye-Bye. Featuring: Deepinder & Amrinder Seghal and Inderraj & Navdeep Singh
172	"Cows and Calves"	23 June 1998
The Teletubbies do the Happy Dance, then they watch Matthew, James and Mark feed their Cows and Calves and watch them grazing in the field. Tinky Winky, Dipsy and Laa Laa eat Tubby Toast at the Tubby Table and Po eats Tubby Toast in her Bed, there's crumbs everywhere so Noo Noo tidies up. The Windmill starts spinning and the Teletubbies watch the Animal Parade before the Magic Windmill stops spinning and it is time for Tubby Bye Bye. Featuring: Matthew, James and Mark Carnie
173	"The Pier"	24 June 1998
The Teletubbies walk round and round some hills, then they watch some children explore a pier. After that, they go off to watch the Lion and Bear play their hide and seek game in Teletubbyland. Then the Teletubbies go do the Walking Dance before doing the Tubby bye bye sequence. Featuring: Christopher & James Botting, Katy Griffin, Mungo & Joseph Kett, Saalim Koomar, Rebecca Lawlor and Matthew Wise
174	"Becky's Flake Cakes"	25 June 1998
The Teletubbies are feeling hungry, so they sit down to eat some Tubby Toast, but the Tubby Toaster isn't working. So they start pushing buttons but it doesn't work and they're still hungry. The Noo-noo tidies up around the Toaster and it begins to work. The Teletubbies are very happy and eat their Tubby Toast very quickly. Then the Teletubbies watch Becky make treats for her friend Mark. Featuring: Marc Connor and Rebecca Thomas
175	"Hand Painting"	25 June 1998
Dipsy walks in front of the trees to say hello to the viewers. Afterwards, the windmill spins and he joins the others, and The Teletubbies watch two girls having their hands painted. Po decides to decorate Home Hill with handprints. She decorated the table, the tubby toaster, the doors, and the steps. And the whole house was decorated with hand prints when she heard Tinky Winky, Dipsy, and Laa-Laa. Po showed the other teletubbies her decorations when the Noo-Noo tidied up the handprints. Then the teletubbies had a good laugh until they heard the Magic Windmill spin, then they said "Uh-Oh!" then they ran outside. The Magic Windmill stopped spinning for Tubby Bye Bye. Featuring: Elissa and Leah Patel
176	"Mark and Topus" "Mark & Topus"	29 June 1998
Tinky Winky, Dipsy and Laa-Laa run over the hills to say Eh-oh and then Po pops up and says Boo. The Teletubbies watch Mark go for a ride on his pony Topus. Po goes on a long journey far far away on her scooter and then all the way home again, the other Teletubbies wait for her and when she comes back they all have a Big Hug and "Tubby Bye-Bye" takes place. Featuring: Matthew, James and Mark Carnie
177	"Numbers – 10"	30 June 1998
Laa Laa is out for a walk before the Windmill starts spinning. The Teletubbies watch some children learn about the number 10. Inside the House, Tinky Winky, Dipsy and Laa-Laa sit on their seats. Po arrives on her scooter. She bumps into the slide and the walls until she falls off. Po sits down on the slide and the other Teletubbies stand up and sit down too. They all do it again and again and laughing at the noises they make. The magical event with The Magic Tree also occurs. After it disappeared, the Magic Windmill stops spinning. The "Tubby Bye-Bye" sequence takes place. Featuring: The Children of Duncombe School, London
178	"Washing the Elephant"	1 July 1998
The Teletubbies run indoors and then run out again to watch Andy Brown and Georgina wash a female elephant called Anna. Laa-Laa and Dipsy have a messy accident. They both tread in some Tubby Custard, so the Noo-Noo tidies up, again and again. All the Tubby Custard gets mixed up inside the Noo-Noo and he shoots all out onto the doors. Featuring: Andy Brown and Georgina Day
179	"Windmill"	2 July 1998
The Teletubbies take turns to stand on a hill, in front of the house, next to a tree and under a cloud. But each time they stand under the cloud it begins to rain. Gregory and Matthew show the Teletubbies their windmill. The Teletubbies do the Round and Round Dance before Tubby Bye-Bye. Featuring: Matthew and Gregory Dobson
180	"Putting Angus To Bed"	3 July 1998
The Teletubbies watch James help his mummy put his baby brother Angus to bed. In Teletubbyland, Dipsy is asleep, so the other Teletubbies are being quiet. They find it difficult to be quiet and not wake Dipsy up, however. The Magic Windmill stops spinning as the Tubby Bye-Bye takes place. Featuring: James and Angus Carnie
181	"Hair Braiding"	6 July 1998
Laa-Laa and Po hug and the Teletubbies all watch a young girl having her hair braided. Tinky Winky can't get to sleep, so Dipsy helps him by singing him a lullaby. That made Tinky-Winky, along with Laa Laa and Po, go to sleep. Clever Dipsy. After all that singing, Dipsy was feeling tired. So he went to sleep before Tubby Bye-Bye. Featuring: Pamela and Reianna Nembhand
182	"Kittens"	7 July 1998
Outside the Teletubbies Home Hill a voice trumpet makes a MEOW noise like a Kitten Then the Teletubbies watch Matthew, James and Mark play with their new kittens. Inside the Teletubbies' Home Hill a voice trumpet gives a message for the Teletubbies and fell asleep and the Teletubbies wake up and the Magic Windmill start spinning and they rush outside to watch The Animal Parade and the Magic Windmill stops spinning. Featuring: Matthew, James and Mark Carnie
183	"Funny Walks"	8 July 1998
Tinky Winky is asleep, Dipsy is making some adjustments and Laa Laa is eating Tubby Toast, and Po runs and jumps around the House in some very unusual ways and none of the Teletubbies can work out what Po is doing, then they decide to act like Po and run around the House in these funny ways. Then the Windmill spins and they all watch some children doing funny walks. Then, the Teletubbies do funny walks of their own. Then the Magic Windmill stops spinning and it is time for Tubby Bye-Bye. Featuring: The Children of Academic Day Care, New Jersey
184	"Jigsaw – Rabbits"	9 July 1998
In Teletubbyland, Dipsy, Laa Laa and Po were finding Tinky Winky. After they found him, the Magic Windmill starts spinning and the Teletubbies run off to watch some children building a jigsaw rabbit puzzle before Tubby Bye Bye. Featuring: Aaron Ellis, Danielle Miller and Sally Sadler
185	"My Violin"	10 July 1998
Po rides her Scooter into the House. The Teletubbies listen to Bryony play Twinkle, Twinkle, Little Star on the violin. The Teletubbies listen to a voice trumpet play Twinkle, Twinkle, Little Star on the violin and the Tuba, but Noo Noo is being too noisy. When the voice trumpet stops playing the lovely music, Noo Noo starts making his own music by sucking and slurping the same tune. Then the Magic Windmill stops spinning and it was time for Tubby Bye-Bye. Featuring: Bryony Kay
186	"Boys and Eggs"	13 July 1998
In Teletubbyland, Dipsy was out for a walk, when he saw Tinky Winky, he saw Dipsy, reminding him to watch out for a wind, when Dipsy arrives at the trees (same trees from The Lion and Bear) he suddenly notices the wind, so it blew Dipsy's hat into the air. And Tinky Winky noticed that Dipsy's Hat is on the air, so Tinky Winky reminds Dipsy to catch his hat before the wind blows it somewhere else in Teletubbyland, so Dipsy goes try to catch his hat before it blows away. Meanwhile, Laa Laa and Po were having Tubby Toast inside the house. Suddenly, they heard the wind, the wind blew Dipsy's hat in front of the house, then goes in the hole, it takes it down the slide. Then, Po got Dipsy's hat. Suddenly, the Noo Noo manages to tidy up Dipsy's hat. Naughty Noo Noo! Laa Laa and Po chase him around the house. Then, the Noo Noo untidies Dipsy's Hat, and Dipsy's Hat goes up the slide. It manages to return to Dipsy, first it goes out of the hole on the Home Hill. Dipsy was worried about his hat, and just then, Dipsy's hat is back on Dipsy. And then the Magic Windmill spins so Laa Laa and Po runs out and Dipsy walks to join the other Teletubbies and he suddenly noticed his hat is left behind on the path. Then the Teletubbies watch Matthew, James and Mark collect eggs before the Sun Baby giggles for Tubby Bye-Bye. Featuring: Matthew, James and Mark Carnie
187	"Hovercraft"	14 July 1998
The Teletubbies pop up from some hills, then they watch two children travel on a hovercraft. The Teletubbies wake up after a little sleep and they make their beds up, but Po drops her blanket, The Noo-Noo tidies it up and the Teletubbies chase him around the house, the Teletubbies love the Noo-Noo very much. The Magic Windmill starts spinning and the Teletubbies watch The Three Ships before the Magic Windmill stops spinning and it is time for Tubby Bye-Bye. Featuring: Zack Adams, Traci & Hannah Carroll and Monique Gordon
188	"Robin"	15 July 1998
The Teletubbies run and Po says 'boo' before the Magic Windmill spins and the Teletubbies watch Andy Brown and two children watch a robin in the garden. The Teletubbies are "Calling Out!" to each other. Featuring: Andy Brown with Emily and Jack Baker
189	"Feeding My Baby Sister"	16 July 1998
Dipsy enters the house and made Tubby custard but the Magic Windmill spins and the Teletubbies watch a little girl help feed her baby sister. Po makes some Tubby Custard for Dipsy. The Magic Windmill stops spinning and it's time for Tubby Bye Bye. Featuring: Tamsin and Georgina George
190	"Long Horns"	17 July 1998
Inside the Home Hill, Laa-Laa makes some adjustments on the control panel. Suddenly, the Magic Windmill spins. The Teletubbies watch Sam and his mum visit a Temple to hear the horns. Annie is teaching Sam how to play the horn. They have fun blowing it and making noises and Sam shows how the horn closes. Then, in Teletubbyland, the Teletubbies go to the path to do the Jumping Dance by the Windmill. Then the Windmill starts to spin. The Teletubbies run down the path to watch the Magical Event of the Lion and Bear . The Sun Baby Giggles and The "Tubby Bye-Bye" sequence takes place and the Baby Sun sets. Featuring: Samye Adgo
191	"Colours – Purple"	31 August 1998
Po listen to a voice trumpet say 'Purple' and she sees a purple cloud. The Teletubbbies watch children learn about the colour purple. A purple flower appears from far away in Teletubbyland. Laa-Laa and Dipsy don't like the smell of it but Tinky-Winky does. Featuring: The Children of Oxhey Infants School, Watford
192	"Ballet – Jack In The Box"	1 September 1998
The Teletubbies are sitting at the table and saying; 'Eh-oh!' then a Voice trumpet rises and the Teletubbies bounce up and down on their seats to some piano music until the Magic Windmill spins and the Teletubbies watch some children perform a Jack in the Box dance, then a pair of curtains appears. Dipsy and Laa-Laa have great fun as the curtains open and close. Featuring: The Children of The Heidi Rhodes School of Dance
193	"Spiders"	2 September 1998
The Teletubbies go to sleep in the Superdome then the Magic windmill started to spin and wakes them up. The Teletubbies watch Georgina and Andy look at a Spider in the Garden. Then in the Superdome Tinky Winky hears two Voice Trumpets say the nursery rhyme called Incy Wincy Spider. The Windmill starts spinning and the Animal Parade marches through Teletubbyland. The Teletubbies do a Calypso Dance before Tubby Bye Bye. Featuring: Andy Brown with Georgina Day
194	"Blackberry Picking"	2 September 1998
Po loves jumping. She jumps inside Home Hill. Then the magic windmill spins and she jumps off to watch some children go blackberry picking. Tinky Winky, Dipsy and Po play a hiding game while Laa-Laa is playing with her Ball. Then she found Tinky-Winky, Dipsy and Po by the bushes and say eh-oh to them until Po says eh-oh to Laa-Laa. Then they run for Laa-Laa by giving her a big hug until the magic windmill starts spinning and they run off to see the magic house, after that they do the tip toe dance before Tubby Bye-Bye. Featuring: Christabel & Rose Cant, Beth Day and Harry & Jack Jones
195	"Fancy Dress"	4 September 1998
Laa-Laa and Dipsy hug and run off to watch some children making some fancy dress clothes. A crown appears in Teletubbyland and when Tinky-Winky finds the crown he becomes a king called "King Tinky-Winky". He walks around Teletubbyland pretending to be a king. Featuring: Augustus Betz, Leia Kennedy, Duncan MacKinnon and Claire Sheil
196	"Numbers – 5 (version 3)"	7 September 1998
A voice trumpet rises and counts five. Tinky Winky jumps five times and then runs off to watch some children learn about the number five. Five voice trumpets rise and play some lovely music for the Teletubbies. Featuring: The Children at Treasure Island School, Florida
197	"Rebecca's Dogs"	8 September 1998
The Teletubbies run out the back door saying hello to the audience. Just as they stand outside, the Windmill starts spinning and they run off to watch a girl called Rebecca, who shows us her dogs doing some tricks. A swing appears in Teletubbyland and Laa-Laa plays on the swing. Po has a go but she keeps falling off. So Laa-Laa shows Po how to play. Featuring: Rebecca Winfield
198	"Clogs"	9 September 1998
A Voice Trumpet rises, and Tinky Winky plays a there-and-back game on the path. Some children watch clogs being made. Laa-Laa goes for a walk, but outside it is raining. She goes inside and chases the Noo Noo then catches the other Teletubbies to watch The Tap Dancing Teddy Bear inside the carousel, the Magic Windmill stops spinning and it is time for Tubby Bye Bye. Featuring: Gordon Rush, Paige & Devon Gibson, Rosaleen Howorth and Jake Rigby
199	"Cuddles Gets Lost"	10 September 1998
Laa Laa fetches the others to watch Brian Cant tell some children a story about a teddy bear called Cuddles. Laa Laa is playing with her ball then Tinky Winky and Dipsy are walking together and Po appears. They all wondered where Laa Laa was. and they found her and all the Teletubbies had a big hug. Featuring: Brian Cant, Aneesha Pomerenke, Sam Whitworth and Rachel Yip
200	"Squeezy Painting"	11 September 1998
Inside the Home Hill Po has to eat her Tubby Custard but the Magic Windmill stops her and she watches children painting in the garden. After that Po and the other Teletubbies prepare for some Tubby Custard again. The Teletubbies also try to be very careful not to spill their Tubby Custard but if they do the Noo-Noo has to tidy up. The Teletubbies have a big hug before Tubby Bye Bye. Featuring: Louise Condon with Julien Jallane, Leia Kennedy and Bernadette Marron
201	"Woodlice"	14 September 1998
Tinky Winky and Po give each other a Big Hug before the Magic Windmill spins, and the Teletubbies watch Andy Brown and some children looking for creatures. They find some woodlice under a log. Tinky Winky, Dipsy and Laa-Laa go in, and out of the roundabout with the Tubbytronic Superdome. The Teletubbies play an in and out and roundabout game. Featuring: Andy Brown with Emily and Jack Baker, Josh Reynolds and Jodie Wiltshire
202	"Land Yachting"	15 September 1998
Dipsy jumps indoors, then the Teletubbies run off to watch Annie and her dad land-yachting on a beach. The Teletubbies are having a very busy day until a big wind blows. The wind is so strong that it blows the Teletubbies favourite things away. The Teletubbies decide to sing a Come back everything song and then the wind drops and their favourite things come back to them. The Teletubbies are very happy again. Featuring: Megan & Abigail Gosbee and Annie & Jim Moran
203	"Tropical Fish"	16 September 1998
The Teletubbies are asleep in bed. They sit up to listen as five voice trumpets rise playing some lovely music. The Teletubbies join hands and dance round and round in a circle. Then the Teletubbies watch a group of children at an aquarium store. They look in all the tanks at the different fish. Tinky Winky pretends to swim. He swims round the table, then swims off to find the other Teletubbies and the magical event with The Three Ships sailing past occurs before the Magic Windmill stops spinning and it is time for Tubby Bye-Bye. Featuring: Sinead Gabriel and Donnette Harry
204	"My Piano"	17 September 1998
Tinky Winky, Dipsy, Laa Laa and Po are playing with their favourite things on the path while listening to piano music from a Voice Trumpet before the Magic Windmill starts spinning, and the Teletubbies watch a little girl play her piano. A voice trumpet makes a big roaring noise. Tinky Winky, Dipsy and Laa Laa have lots of fun running away from the Voice Trumpet's roars. Featuring: Bryony Kay
205	"Twirlers"	18 September 1998
Tinky Winky listens to a voice trumpet make the sound of a whistle blowing and he runs away from the repeating noise. The Teletubbies watch some children marching and dancing with Twirlers. Then the Teletubbies march with their Favourite Things, after that the Windmill starts to spin and the Teletubbies watch The Animal Parade, then the Windmill stops spinning for Tubby Bye-Bye. Featuring: Pouneh Almasi, Annette Borg, Gabriella Franco, Mary & Charlie Sands and Carrie & Joliene Wade
206	"The Very Proud Crown"	21 September 1998
Tinky Winky comes down the slide and says 'eh-oh!' to Po. A voice trumpet comes up and plays some music. Tinky Winky and Po dance around the inside of Home Hill until the Magic Windmill spins and the Teletubbies Watch Tamzin Griffin pretending to be the Funny Lady and telling a story of a very proud crown. Laa Laa invites Dipsy to go for a walk over the hills. Featuring: Tamzin Griffin, The Children of Ravenor Infant's School, Greenford
207	"Boom Boom Dance"	22 September 1998
The Teletubbies all sit down on a hill before watching some people do a dance called "The Boom-Boom Dance" to bongo music. In Teletubbyland, Tinky-Winky is sleeping and he does the Boom-Boom dance when he wakes up. Dipsy is going on a walk, and then does the Boom-boom dance. Laa-Laa is eating Tubby toast and then does the Boom-Boom dance. Po is riding on her scooter, and then does the Boom-Boom dance. The Teletubbies meet up and do the Boom-Boom dance together, even the Noo-Noo joins in. The "Tubby Bye-Bye" sequence takes place and The Baby Sun sets. Featuring: The Kokuma Dance Company, The Children of Birmingham Settlement Nursery
208	"Peacocks"	23 September 1998
In Teletubbyland Dipsy came in to say eh-oh then run back out to fetch the others back inside before they say eh-oh also. Then they bump their tummies before giving Big hugs. Then the magic windmill starts spinning and they rushed out to watch Andy Brown and some children looking at peacocks. Then the windmill spins again and they arrived to watch the magical tree that appears in Teletubbyland. A voice trumpet rises and Laa Laa and Po march to the music and the "Tubby Bye-Bye" sequence takes place. Featuring: Andy Brown with Harriet Spilsbury and Philip Taylor
209	"Numbers – 6 (version 2)"	24 September 1998
Inside the Home Hill, the Teletubbies were having Tubby Toast, but there's no toast for Laa Laa after she pushed a button. So Laa Laa pushes a button again, and Laa Laa still doesn't have toast. Laa Laa tries again one more time. But there's still toast for Laa Laa. Laa Laa was very sad, and she sings about Tubby Toast very sadly. So Tinky Winky, Dipsy and Po decided to share their toast with Laa Laa. And Laa Laa has six toast on her plate. And Laa Laa was happy again. Then the Magic Windmill starts spinning and the Teletubbies run off to watch some children learn about the number six before the Sun baby giggles for Tubby Bye Bye. Featuring: The Children of Duncombe School, London
210	"Basketball"	25 September 1998
The Teletubbies put their arms in the air with a Voice Trumpet, then the Magic Windmill started to spin so they go see some basketball. The little boy got a basket. Then the Teletubbies are careful not to drop their Tubby Toast. Tinky Winky makes a mess because his toast was on the floor so Noo-Noo cleans it up, then the Teletubbies chase him around for a hug and the magic windmill started to spin again. When they say uh-oh they rush off to see the dancing bear in a stage to end the episode. After the Dancing Bear had finished the Magic Windmill stopped spinning and it was time for Tubby Bye Bye. Featuring: Jordan & Philip Mathews
211	"Rangoli"	28 September 1998
The Teletubbies walk in and out before the Magic Windmill spins and the Teletubbies watch a little boy and his mum paint some Rangoli pictures for the Hindu and Sikh festival of Diwali. A decoration appears in Teletubbyland. The Tubbies think the decoration is very decorative, but Dipsy is not too pleased when the decoration decorates him! Featuring: Rikesh Karsan
212	"Frogs"	29 September 1998
The Teletubbies watch Andy Brown and two children looking into a pool of frogs. Laa-Laa looks at the flowers, but Dipsy keeps getting in the way. Featuring: Andy Brown with Emily & Jack Baker
213	"Old King Cole"	30 September 1998
Laa-Laa watches some children sing and act out the nursery rhyme Old King Cole. Then the Teletubbies act out their own version of Old King Cole. Featuring: The Children of Hardwick Primary School, Banbury
214	"Jigsaw – Elephant"	1 October 1998
Inside the Teletubbies' Superdome, the Teletubbies giggle together as they hold hands and side step around Home Hill. Then they rush outside to watch three children build a jigsaw puzzle of an elephant. Later, the Bear and Lion appear and play hide and seek in Teletubbyland before the Magic Windmill stops spinning and it is time for Tubby Bye-Bye. Featuring: Aaron Ellis, Danielle Miller and Sally Sadler
215	"Naughty Soap"	2 October 1998
The Noo Noo helps Po wash with her Tubby sponge. Meanwhile, funny lady Tamzin Griffin tells the story of a silly, soppy soap. Featuring: Tamzin Griffin, The Children of Chater Infants School, Watford
216	"Dad's Portrait"	5 October 1998
The Teletubbies hide from Noo-Noo, whenever Noo-Noo looks to see whats behind him the Teletubbies go back to their hiding places. They come out from their hiding places when it is time for the video clip. The Teletubbies watch a girl painting a picture of her dad and repeatedly dance to a voice trumpet singing the nursery rhyme Here We Go Looby Loo. Then the Windmill stops spinning and it is time for Tubby Bye-Bye. Featuring: Thena and Peter Mimmack
217	"Colours – Orange"	6 October 1998
A Voice Trumpet appears, which draws the attention of Noo-Noo, and Laa-Laa. It says the word 'Orange' .The Teletubbies watch some children finding out about things that are coloured orange and Laa-Laa's ball is also bright orange . Laa-Laa keeps losing her ball, she meets the other Teletubbies, they learn that Tinky Winky's bag is red, Dipsy's hat is black and white and Po's scooter is pink and blue. Laa Laa finally catches her ball. Then the Windmill stops spinning for tubby bye bye. Featuring: The Children of Oxhey Infants School, Watford
218	"Piglets"	7 October 1998
The Teletubbies run back and forth past some trees, then they watch Matthew, James, Mark, Angus and their Dad playing with their piglets. Inside the Tubbytronic Superdome, the Teletubbies laugh at the noises their bottoms make when they sit down, then they watch the Animal Parade march through Teletubbyland. The Teletubbies do the Stamping and Stepping Dance before the Tubby Bye-Bye sequence takes place and the Baby Sun sets. Featuring: Matthew, James, Mark and Angus Carnie
219	"Water"	8 October 1998
In Teletubbyland, Dipsy listens to a Voice Trumpet say the nursery rhyme 'Doctor Foster'. Then the Teletubbies watch some children playing with water. A cloud appears in Teletubbyland. The cloud rains and makes a puddle. Laa Laa steps into the puddle, Dipsy steps around the puddle, Tinky Winky steps over the puddle and Po rides her Scooter through the puddle spraying the other Teletubbies. The Teletubbies love Po very much. Featuring: Amy and Harry Scott
220	"Wrapping"	9 October 1998
The Teletubbies dance The Swinging Dance before watching some children wrapping presents for their friend. The Teletubbies are asleep before Noo Noo comes along and tidies up. The Teletubbies chase the Noo Noo before the Magic Windmill spins. The Singing Man in the Pink House also appears in Teletubbyland before the sun baby giggles for "Tubby Bye-Bye." Featuring: Christine Liang, Lupondo Lyambo, Stacey Mulryan and Minh Nguyen
221	"Making Bread"	12 October 1998
The Teletubbies go in and out of the house before the Magic Windmill spins and the Teletubbies watch two little boys making some bread. After the Stretching dance, they then watch The Three Ships sail through Teletubbyland, the Baby Sun giggles while the Voice Trumpet rises for Tubby Bye-Bye. Featuring: George and Thomas Griffiths
222	"Ice Lollipops"	13 October 1998
Laa Laa appears and tries to make some Tubby Custard but the Magic Windmill spins and Po watches some children making ice-lollies by freezing their favourite juice. The Teletubbies walk around Home Hill smelling the flowers but they all fall over. The Teletubbies all try to go indoors but it is not possible and then they have to go in one at a time. The Teletubbies decided to go up the slide but they fell down. They get up and go up the slide one at a time. Featuring: Becky, Toby & Connor Knight, Manjot Singh, Kyle Strudwick, Antonia Suckling and Christopher Wiggans
223	"Orange Picking"	14 October 1998
Dipsy comes out of the house. He looks and listens before going inside of the house. The Teletubbies come out of the house and the Magic Windmill spins. The Teletubbies watch children picking fresh oranges. Tinky Winky and Po are eating Tubby Toast. Laa Laa comes into Home Hill and she plays with the ball but it bounces all over home hill and the ball is stuck up the top of the slide. Tinky Winky reaches but he is too short. Po comes up the slide but she slides back down. Noo Noo comes along and he sucks the ball up. Noo Noo gives the ball back to Laa Laa The Teletubbies chase Noo Noo around Home Hill. Featuring: Wil and Leah Flannery
224	"Double Bass"	15 October 1998
A Voice Trumpet appears to make music for Laa-Laa, and the pals, Then Po receives a video watch children visit their friend who plays the double bass. The Teletubbies do the Calypso dance and Dipsy has a go on the switch panel before the Magic Windmill stops spinning and it is time for Tubby Bye-Bye. Featuring: Gary Crosby with Kadeem Clarke, Rehanna Mundle and Shanice Weekes-Brown
225	"Numbers – 7"	18 October 1998
Seven clouds appear but they quickly go away. The Teletubbies watch some children learning about the number 7. The Teletubbies join each other on the table and a Voice Trumpet rises and counts to 7. The Teletubbies do the round and round dance before Tubby Bye-Bye. Featuring: The Children of Duncombe School, London
226	"Sparkly Spider"	19 October 1998
The Teletubbies walk in a line and they walk up a hill and walk down the hill before they meet in the middle and say 'Eh-oh!' before the Magic Windmill spins and the Teletubbies watch the Funny Lady tell the story of the Sparkly Spider. The Teletubbies do the Dizzy dance before the Magic Windmill Spins and the Teletubbies watch the Magic Tree before the Magic Windmill stops spinning for Tubby Bye Bye. Featuring: Tamzin Griffin, The Children of Ravenor School, Greenford
227	"Cat's Night Out"	20 October 1998
The Teletubbies walk down the Path, into the House and up the other Path. Then they watch Nathan talk about what his Cat Grace does at night. Inside the House, Po wakes up and hears the other Teletubbies shouting outside, she runs out to them for a Big Hug, the Windmill starts spinning and they all watch the Animal Parade. The Teletubbies do the Walking Dance before Tubby Bye Bye. Featuring: Nathan Grammell and Grace the Cat
228	"Chicks"	21 October 1998
The Teletubbies walk around some hills before watching Matthew, James and Mark talking about their chicks on a farm. Dipsy watches Po riding on her scooter, Laa-Laa playing with her ball and Tinky Winky running with his bag. So Dipsy gives each other a big hug before tubby bye bye. Featuring: Matthew, James, Mark and Angus Carnie
229	"Body to Body"	22 October 1998
The Teletubbies bump into each other indoors than watch some children play a body to body game. The Teletubbies then play a falling down game before watching the Tap Dancing Teddy Bear before the Magic Windmill stops spinning for Tubby Bye-Bye. Featuring: The Children of Earlsfield Primary School
230	"Camping"	23 October 1998
A door appears in Teletubbyland. Po comes and founds it. She opens the door and goes in. Then comes Laa-Laa and knocks the door, so Po opens the door and Laa-Laa goes with Po. Soon comes Dipsy who knocks the door and goes with Laa-Laa and Po. Finally comes Tinky Winky and knocks the door and goes with the other Teletubbies. The door then disappears and the magic windmill starts spinning and the Teletubbies watch children go camping with their parents before the baby sun giggles for Tubby Bye-Bye. Featuring: Joel and Kiri Wood
231	"Colours – Black"	14 December 1998
A black and white cloud appears in Teletubbyland. The Teletubbies watch some children finding out about things that are coloured black. Dipsy leaves his hat behind, but when he comes to find it, the Noo-Noo has tidied up. Later, the Noo-Noo blows it out before the Magic Windmill stops spinning as the Tubby Bye-Bye sequence takes place. Featuring: The Children of Oxhey Infants School, Watford
232	"Pebbles"	15 December 1998
The Teletubbies walk around the tree and the windmill starts to spin when they watch two boys and two girls pick up pebbles to create a smile face in the sand with their dad. Later, in Teletubbyland, It Was Time for Tubby Toast, But The Tubby Toast Machine Wouldn't Work. So Tinky-Winky Tried It Again But It Still Wouldn't Work. So He Tried It Again But It Beeped 3 Times, But Then The Tubby Toast Made 3 Tubby Toasts for 4 Teletubbies. (The Tubby Toast Has Made a Happy Pattern On The Table). Then The Teletubbies Do The Stretching Dance, And Then The Magic Windmill stopped spinning as The Tubby Bye-Bye Takes Place. Featuring: Eloise Casey, Harry Fellows, Aisha Merrick, Jordan Yahya
233	"Otters"	16 December 1998
Dipsy and Po watch the clouds together and children look for otters. Featuring: Andy Brown with Letesha Gray, Jamie McCullum and Louie Whatling
234	"Decorating Boxes"	17 December 1998
The Teletubbies do the Bumping Dance and then watch children making boxes into a caterpillar. A Box appears from Far Away but it's no ordinary Box. The Teletubbies want to know what's in the box. It's a Jack in the Box. The Teletubbies think that the Jack in the Box is very surprising, then they all run away before the Jack in the Box disappears. Featuring: Christopher & Stephen Bone, Sarah & Jason Brooker, Lawrence & Catherine Smith, Lucienne Spencer and Oliver Taylor
235	"Kathak Dancing"	18 December 1998
The Teletubbies bump tummies and then watch five girls dance a Kathak dance. The Teletubbies play a game and swap their favorite things, but they are very happy when they each have their own special favourite things back. Featuring: Pooja Chapenara, Neelam Gohil, Ritika Mehrotra, Saijal Reahal and Devina Vig
236	"Christmas in South Africa"	21 December 1998
The Teletubbies are playing with their favorite things, but stop to learn about a South African Christmas. Lots of clouds appear in Teletubbyland and it begins to snow. The excited Teletubbies run inside their Tubbytronic Superdome and watch the snow from the window before running out to dance a snowy dance. Featuring: Eira & Catherine Palme and The Children from Sante Sana Game Reserve, South Africa
237	"Christmas in Finland"	22 December 1998
Po remembers the snow and looks outside through the window at the snow. She rushes to the other Teletubbies due to the Windmill Spinning and all the Teletubbies watch some Finnish children sing "The Elves' Christmas Night." When the Teletubbies take a walk and look at the things that are covered in snow, they find out that their favourite things are covered in snow, too. First, Tinky Winky finds his bag. Second, Dipsy finds his hat. Third, Laa-Laa finds her ball. At last, Po finds her scooter. Afterwards, the Teletubbies are happy playing with them. Po rides too fast and slips around Teletubbyland and crashes into a tree, which covers her in snow when she says "Uh-oh!" and then giggles all the time. The other Teletubbies go find out what happened. When Tinky Winky, Dipsy and Laa-Laa find something covered in snow and they don't know what it is, Po pops out of the snow when she sits up and they all have a Big Hug. Featuring: Tuomas, Natias, Katarina, Sofia, Aleksi, Daniel, Alexander, Mika, Anni, Vilma, Jaaskelainan, Henrietta, Emma, Tuuli, Ella, Hanna, Riku, Suvi and Annika
238	"Christmas in the UK"	23 December 1998
Dipsy remembers the snow. The Teletubbies watch some children gospel singing and go into the snow. They are walking very carefully because the snow can be very slippery. When Tinky Winky slips, he begins to slide. It looks like fun so the other Teletubbies slide in the snow too. Laa-Laa wants to slide too so she slips and slides down the snow. It is Po's turn so she slides down the snow too. Tinky Winky, Laa-Laa and Po want Dipsy to play sliding, but he is too scared until he slides down the snow. He is not scared anymore when the other Teletubbies and narrator say "What clever sliding". Featuring: The New Testament Church of God, Birmingham
239	"Christmas in Spain"	24 December 1998
Inside the House, Laa Laa was asleep in her bed and then she remembers the snow. The Teletubbies learn about a Spanish Christmas. The Teletubbies are very busy in the snow, Tinky Winky and Dipsy make foot prints, Po makes a Po print and Laa-Laa makes a very small snowball. Laa Laa's snowball rolls away and grows bigger and bigger, the Teletubbies chase after it until it rolls up a hill and back down, the Teletubbies all run away from the big snowball. The big snowball rolls into the house and crashes into Noo Noo. The Teletubbies run inside to find Noo Noo covered in snow, what a snowy mess, then Noo Noo tidies up all the snow. Clever Noo Noo. Featuring: Maria Ballester, The Duesa Family and The Juanet Family
240	"Nativity Play"	25 December 1998
Tinky Winky remembers the snow, Just then he suddenly sees the Magic Windmill spinning. The Teletubbies watch some children perform a Nativity Play, then they get busy making snowballs. All the snowballs are different sizes, so the Teletubbies decide to use their snowballs to make a snowtubby. They all love their Snowtubby so much they give him their favourite things. Featuring: Overdale Nursery School, Scarborough
241	"Towers"	28 December 1998
The Teletubbies walk on some hills before watching some children making towers out of bricks. Dipsy and Laa-Laa have fun going up and down. Featuring: The Children of Bartlemas Nursery School, Oxford
242	"Oranges and Lemons"	29 December 1998
The Teletubbies are inside Home Hill when a voice trumpet rises and plays church bell noises, then the Magic Windmill spins and the Teletubbies watch some children playing a game called Oranges and Lemons. Later, a ringing bell appears in Teletubbyland. Dipsy rings the bell, and it makes a very loud ringing sound. After the ringing bell disappears, the Magic Windmill stops spinning, and it is time for Tubby Bye Bye. Featuring: Children from the Heidi Rhodes School of Dancing
243	"Feeding Baby Penguins"	30 December 1998
Inside the Teletubbies' Superdome, Tinky Winky is starting to have Tubby Custard, when the Windmill spins. Tinky Winky turns off the Tubby Custard Machine and rushes outside to fetch the other Teletubbies and they watch group of youngsters feed a flock of baby penguins. The Magic Windmill starts to spin and the Teletubbies run off to the Magical Event of the Bear and the Lion appear playing hide and seek in the Teletubbyland. After that the Teletubbies go to the path to do the Jumping Dance before the Magic Windmill spins, the Teletubbies said "Uh Oh" and the Magic Windmill stops spinning for Tubby Bye-Bye. Featuring: Hannah Mackay, Alex, Jess & Jo Osborne and Catherine Watkins
244	"Trickle Painting"	31 December 1998
The Teletubbies walk round some hills, then they watch some children make pictures called Trickle Paintings. Inside the house, it's time for Po to have Tubby Custard, but the Tubby Custard Machine won't stop and makes more and more Tubby Custard, Po turns the Tubby Custard Machine off and it's time for the Noo Noo to tidy up, the Teletubbies love Noo Noo very much. Featuring: Christopher & Stephen Bone and Lawrence & Catherine Smith

=== Season 3 (1999) ===
No.	Title	Original release date
245	"Catherine's Toy Farm"	1 January 1999
Inside Home Hill, the Teletubbies sit down on their Tubby seats at the table. The Windmill spins and the Teletubbies watch a little girl play with her toy farm. Later, outside the Home Hill, Laa-Laa walks out and says Eh Oh and then runs back inside and comes back out with the other Teletubbies. Then the Windmill spins again and the Teletubbies rush off to the Magical Event. The Teletubbies see some magic clouds appear in the sky and they follow the clouds and sit down on a hill, until the clouds turn into a herd of sheep! The sheep all come down into Teletubbyland, and the Teletubbies start laughing at them. The sheep wonder off over the hills and while they walk about, a voice says: "Oh, where, oh, where are my sheep?" Something appears in the sky and comes down to Teletubbyland. It is Little Bo Peep. She is singing a song how she's lost her sheep so she starts to look for them around Teletubbyland. The sheep are singing as well and they start hiding and Little Bo Peep just couldn't see them anywhere! She soon finds them behind the hills and sings a song how she's found her sheep and together she and her sheep fly up into the sky and disappear as the Voice Trumpet rises for Tubby Bye Bye. Featuring: Catherine Smith
246	"Ten Little Men Finger Play"	4 January 1999
Inside the house, Dipsy listens to a voice trumpet count to ten. The Teletubbies watch Debbie and some children do a ten little men finger play. The Teletubbies play a game called Ring Around the Roses. After that, they watch The Magic Tree. The Teletubbies do the Walking Dance before Tubby Bye-Bye. Featuring: Debbie Ivens, Olivia Allen, Olivia Trangmar, Edward Mitchell, Katherine, Michael and Paul Vanner, Aaron Sharma, Charlie Walsh, Natasha and Harry Garrood
247	"Harp"	5 January 1999
Tinky-Winky was having fun with the controllers when the windmill was spinning he went outside to fetch Dipsy, Laa-Laa and Po. Then they watched a girl and her mom playing with a harp twice. After the clip Tinky-Winky discovered a harp in Teletubby Land then Po came by and decided to use the harp then the harp disappeared. Then it was time for Tubby Bye-Bye. Featuring: Eleanor Hudson and R'varne Naji
248	"Hermit Crabs"	6 January 1999
Tinky Winky, Dipsy and Laa laa walk in a circle, then Po pops up. The Magic Windmill spins and the Teletubbies watch Andy Brown and some children looking on a beach for hermit crabs. Then the Teletubbies play a coming-and-going game. Featuring: Andy Brown with Jon Allsop, Alix Roberts and Edward Hone
249	"Making Mosaics"	7 January 1999
The Teletubbies dance around the hills, then watch some children making mosaics from different shapes. Featuring: Hannah Kamugisha, Eliot Laws, Hayley Kyte and Kristin Berry
250	"Ball Games with Debbie"	8 January 1999
Dipsy is not amused when the Noo-noo eats his hat. The Teletubbies watch as Debbie shows a group of children some ball games. Laa-Laa's ball goes in a puddle, and she needs Po's help to get it back before The Magic Windmill spins and the Teletubbies watch The Three Ships. The Magic Windmill stops spinning and the Tubby Bye-Bye sequence takes place. Featuring: Debbie Ivens, Olivia Allen, Olivia Trangmar, Edward Mitchell, Katherine, Michael and Paul Vanner, Aaron Sharma, Charlie Walsh, Natasha and Harry Garrood
251	"Fruit Tasting"	15 March 1999
Po walks along and says 'Eh-oh!' Po smelled the flowers and she liked the smell and said; "Ahhhhh!" Tinky Winky comes along and smells the flowers and wondered what Po was doing. Po smelled flowers as well as Tinky Winky. Po and Tinky Winky linked arms with Po and they smelled the flowers together before The Magic Windmill starts spinning and the Teletubbies watch some children tasting some fruit. The Teletubbies do the Dizzy Dance before the Magic Windmill spins; the Teletubbies say; 'Uh-oh!' and the Magic Windmill stops spinning for Tubby Bye Bye. Featuring: The Children of Earlsfield Primary School
252	"Colours - Yellow"	16 March 1999
Tinky Winky listens to a Voice Trumpet say "Yellow". And then a cloud appeared and turned sunny yellow. The Windmill starting spinning and the cloud disappeared. Laa Laa and the other Teletubbies watch some children learn about the colour yellow. In Teletubbyland, the clouds appears, and they turn into sheep and came to down below before they wonder off. Also, Little Bo Peep appeared before the Magic Windmill stopped spinning and it was time for Tubby Bye-Bye. Featuring: The Children of Oxhey Infants School, Watford
253	"Sing a Song of Sixpence"	17 March 1999
A voice trumpet appears and counts to six, then the Magic Windmill started to spin. Laa-Laa said "Uh-oh!" and rushes off to get the other Teletubbies and watched a video about singing of sixpence. The Teletubbies also sing too, then the Magic Windmill started to spin again. They said "Uh-oh!" and went to see the magical event of The Singing Man in the Pink House. The Magic Windmill stops spinning and the Teletubbies go to take part in the Tubby Bye Bye sequence. Featuring: The Children of Hardwick Primary School, Banbury
254	"Caterpillars"	18 March 1999
Children learn about caterpillars, and a magical book shows Po how to count. Featuring: Andy Brown with Molly Wimbush and Ryan Penny
255	"Mark Making Pictures"	19 March 1999
The Teletubbies watch as some children layout a large piece of paper on the floor and put paint into trays. One child puts on some boots and treads in the paint. Then she walks on the paper. Another child uses a broom and a mop to make different marks. The children use balls, balloons and all other objects to make marks on the paper. All the Teletubbies are very busy with their favorite things. Tinky Winky is marching with his bag, Dipsy is dancing in his hat, Laa-Laa is playing with her ball and Po is riding her scooter. Then clouds appear in the sky. The Teletubbies sit down to watch the clouds. They see big fluffy clouds and long wispy clouds. Then, the Teletubbies see clouds that look like Tinky Winky's bag, Dipsy's hat, Laa-Laa's ball and Po's scooter.The "Tubby Bye-Bye" sequence takes place before The Baby Sun sets. Featuring: Matthew & Miles Howell and Ashlie Simpson
256	"Clockwork"	22 March 1999
In Teletubbyland, the Teletubbies' favourite things appear, then the Teletubbies play with their favourite things after they appear. Then, the Magic Windmill spins, and the Teletubbies leaves their favourite things to where they were before they run off to watch some children learn about some clockwork. After watching some children about some clockwork, The Teletubbies pretend to be clockwork robots. After that, The Magic Windmill spins and the Teletubbies run off and they see The Magic Tree appearing in Teletubbyland. The tree loses its leaves and it disappears before the Magic Windmill stops spinning. The Tubby Bye-Bye sequence takes place. Featuring: Rex Garrod, Louie Whatling, Letesha Gray and Jamie McCullum
257	"Mary Had a Little Lamb"	23 March 1999
The Teletubbies walk quickly across Teletubbyland before the Magic Windmill spins and children act out the nursery rhyme Mary Had a Little Lamb. Po follows Tinky Winky all over Teletubbyland, The Magic Windmill spins again and the Teletubbies see the Animal Parade (with elephant trumpet sound) before the Magic Windmill stops spinning and it is time for Tubby Bye Bye. Featuring: The Children of The Heidi Rhodes School of Dance
258	"Guess Who I Am"	24 March 1999
Dipsy and Laa Laa listen to a voice trumpet make a 'ROAR!' noise and they run away around the House. The Teletubbies watch some children pretending to be animals. Tinky Winky listen to a voice trumpet make a 'ROAR!' noise and he runs away around the House, when the voice trumpet goes down Tinky Winky runs away and Noo Noo zooms around the House. Po comes down the slide and Tinky Winky comes back with Dipsy and Laa Laa, the voice trumpet rises up again and make the 'ROAR!' noise, instead of running away Po copies the noise until the voice trumpet goes down, all the Teletubbies have a Big Hug. Featuring: Lily Sumner, Megan McKeown, Morgane Wagner and Sepehr Karimpour
259	"Hedgehogs"	25 March 1999
The Teletubbies watch a young boy whose mum and dad look after poorly hedgehogs. The Teletubbies do the stamping and stepping dance before the Magic Windmill Spins. Little Bo Peep has lost her sheep. After she searched for her sheep, she and her sheep float away into the sky, as The Magic Windmill stops spinning, and the Baby Sun sets. Featuring: Andy Brown with Christopher, Jackie & Steve Lloyd
260	"Boots"	26 March 1999
Tinky-Winky jumps indoors. Then the Teletubbies watch some children having fun wearing their boots. They put them on and stamp in them. Their friend Nick, the gardener, explains how he always wears his boots in the garden. When they were finished, they washed their boots with a hose. Later, a pair of boots appear in Teletubbyland. Tinky-Winky tries them on and goes for a walk. Po tries the boots on, but they're too big. So Tinky-Winky shows Po his special "boots" dance. Featuring: Nick Watkinson with Lola & Brodie Milne and Sammy Gangadin
261	"Brennan's Moonwalk"	2 August 1999
Noo Noo was tidying up the Tubbytronic Superdome and Tinky Winky entered the house. He chased the Noo Noo until the Magic Windmill spins and the Teletubbies watch a little boy pretend to fly to the moon. In Teletubbyland, the Teletubbies are going out to play. The Teletubbies think they are ready to go, but then they have to wait while each Teletubby takes turns to fetch their favourite thing. When the Teletubbies have finished playing with their favourite thing, the Magic Windmill stops spinning and it is time for Tubby Bye-Bye. Featuring: Brennan & Natalie Pilcher
262	"Crawling"	3 August 1999
The Teletubbies watch some children crawling then the Teletubbies see the Magic Tree before the Magic Windmill stops spinning and it is time for Tubby Bye Bye. Featuring: The Children of Weston Park Primary School, their families & friends
263	"Shrimps in the Sand"	4 August 1999
The Teletubbies pop up from hills and meet in the middle before the Magic Windmill spins and the Teletubbies watch Andy Brown and some children look for shrimp in rock pools, then hide from each other. Featuring: Andy Brown, Jon Allsop, Edward Hone & Alix Roberts
264	"Cuddles Poor Paw"	5 August 1999
Noo Noo is hovering around the Tubbytronic Superdome and Po crawls through the slide's arch and says; 'Eh-oh!' before the Magic Windmill spins. Po goes up the slide and the Teletubbies watch Brian Cant tell a story to a group of children, then they play a who did it game working out who spilled the Tubby Custard, make a mess with their Tubby Toast at the control panel and then fell asleep. The Magic Windmill starts spinning and they rush outside to watch the Magic House before the Magic Windmill stops spinning for Tubby Bye-Bye. Featuring: Brian Cant, The Children of Elsley Primary School
265	"Handshapes – Turkey"	6 August 1999
Tinky-Winky spills his Tubby Custard and then Noo-Noo tidies up. Then the Teletubbies watch a little girl paint a turkey using her hand. Then a voice trumpet says a joke called Gobble Gobble Wobble Wobble for Laa-Laa which she finds very funny, she tells the Joke to Po and she finds it very funny as well, then they run off to watch the Animal Parade. The Teletubbies do the Stamping and Stepping Dance before "Tubby Bye-Bye". Featuring: Cathy Davison
266	"Clay"	9 August 1999
The Teletubbies watch two boys make models of heads out of clay. Dipsy is very pleased with himself when he discovers his Eyes, Mouth, Nose, and Ears. He shows Tinky Winky and Laa-Laa where their Eyes, Mouth, Nose and Ears are. Nobody can see Po's because she is wearing Dipsy's hat and it covers her head, naughty Po, so Dipsy chases her round Home Hill, then the Teletubbies entering in the house and have a Big Hug. The Magic Windmill stopped spinning (offscreen) and the Teletubbies take part in the Tubby Bye-Bye Sequence. Featuring: Reuben & Liam Wachs
267	"Carousel"	10 August 1999
The Teletubbies watch some children spin around on a carousel. In Teletubbyland a voice trumpet rises and the Teletubbies dance round and round the controls. Afterwards, they watch The Tap Dancing Teddy Bear in his gazebo before The "Tubby Bye-Bye" sequence takes place. Featuring: The Children of the Leeds Valentine Fair
268	"Ladybird"	11 August 1999
The Teletubbies watch Andy Brown and Amber look for some ladybirds. Tinky Winky, Dipsy, and Laa-Laa decide to go high up. Tinky Winky walks to the top of the path. Dipsy climbs to the top of the steps and Laa-Laa dances on top of the hill. But where is Po? She is high up on top of Home Hill. The Teletubbies do the Stretching dance until the Magic Windmill stopped spinning and it is time for Tubby Bye-Bye. Featuring: Andy Brown with Amber Lauder
269	"Yoga"	12 August 1999
In Teletubbyland, the Teletubbies pop out behind the hills twice. Then, the Magic Windmill Spins and The Teletubbies watch some children practice yoga. Back In Teletubbyland, the Teletubbies are very busy. Tinky Winky is marching with his bag, Dipsy is dancing with his hat and Laa-Laa is playing with her ball. Featuring: Anne-Marie Zulkahari & The Learning Tree Nursery, London
270	"Welly Walk"	13 August 1999
Laa-Laa wants the Teletubbies to play Indoors until a cloud appears and rains on Tinky Winky, Dipsy, and Po, then the Magic Windmill spins, the Teletubbies watch A boy called Lewis go walking in his welly boots with his Grandma. The Teletubbies do the Splashing Dance before Tubby Bye-Bye. Featuring: Lewis Reynolds and Mary Duncan
271	"Circles"	16 August 1999
The Teletubbies have fun running around the House before watching some children painting circles. Tinky-Winky and Dipsy make Tubby Custard and Noo Noo tidies up Dipsy's custard. They chase him with Tinky-Winky holds his tubby custard. Be careful, Tinky-Winky. Don't spill your tubby custard. While they chase the Noo Noo, Tinky Winky spills his Tubby Custard all over the floor and then the Noo Noo tidies up. Clever Noo Noo. They chase him again for a big hug. Then the Teletubbies do the Round and Round Dance before Tubby Bye Bye. Featuring: Arjun Kandola, Alex Garstang, Lydia Ashfield and Evangeline Fish
272	"Seahorses"	17 August 1999
Andy Brown and some children look at seahorses. The Teletubbies search for interesting things and Tinky Winky sees his reflection in a puddle. Featuring: Kavita Dhande and Mandeep Shergill
273	"Shoeshine"	18 August 1999
Tinky Winky and Dipsy walk together and they step in a mud puddle and say; "Ewwwwww!" before the Magic Windmill spins and the Teletubbies watch a little girl polish her family's shoes. Back in Teletubbyland. Tinky Winky and Dipsy step in some mud. Tinky Winky makes dirty marks on a carpet and sings a special song to clean it up. Before Tubby Bye-Bye. Featuring: Claire and John Bamford
274	"Tram (Cable Car)"	19 August 1999
Po gives Tinky Winky and Dipsy big hugs. Then the Teletubbies watch two girls go for a ride on a San Francisco Cable car. The driver rings the bell as they drive along and the girls see another cable car driving. The girls laugh as their cable car goes up the hill and then down another one. Laa-Laa and Po go for a walk. Laa-Laa goes the quick way and Po goes the long way round. Po walks around the flowers, in circles and in zigzag patterns. Laa-Laa and Po go to smell the flowers. Laa-Laa goes the quick way and Po goes the long way round. Laa-Laa and Po go into the house. Laa-Laa went the quick way and Po went the long way round. Finally Laa-Laa and Po go to bed. Laa-Laa went the quick way and Po went the long way. Laa-Laa sits and laughs as Po walks around the dome again and again. She gets her scooter, sits on all the chairs and even goes outside again before finally climbing into bed. Featuring: Katrina & Tina Kotton and Katie Munkdale
275	"Apple Pie"	20 August 1999
In Home Hill, Dipsy makes bouncy Tubby Toast, which bounces all around Home Hill. He rushes outside to fetch the Teletubbies to watch two children make an apple pie for a snack. Plus, Little Bo Peep appears in Teletubbyland looking for her lost sheep. Afterwards, the Magic Windmill stops spinning and it is time for Tubby Bye-Bye. Featuring: Toby & Mickey Whelan and Rosa Herxheimer
276	"Spray Paint Mural"	23 August 1999
Tinky Winky, Laa-Laa and Po don't want Dipsy to pull a certain lever on the control panel. The Teletubbies watch some children painting a large mural. The Tubby Custard machine makes a big mess, and the Noo-noo has to clean it up as usual. The Teletubbies do the Falling down dance before the sun baby giggles for Tubby Bye Bye. Featuring: Christopher & Stephen Bone, Lawrence & Catherine Smith and Jason Brooker
277	"Skipping"	24 August 1999
The Teletubbies watch some children who love to skip, and in Teletubbyland, the Teletubbies practice skipping. Featuring: The Children of Weston Park Primary School
278	"Moon"	25 August 1999
Tinky Winky and Dipsy run in and out of the House before the Windmill starts spinning. The Teletubbies watch some children look through a telescope at the moon. Po goes round and round the Tubby Custard machine, the beds, the Noo-Noo, the Table and all the Teletubbies go round and round the House. The Windmill starts spinning and the Dancing Bear appears in his gazebo. The Magic Windmill stops spinning and it is time for Tubby Bye Bye. Featuring: Isobel Stocker, Jonti Siva-Jothy and Dennis Ashton
279	"Fox Cubs"	26 August 1999
Po rides her scooter before the Magic Windmill spins. Then the Teletubbies watch Andy Brown and the children go in search of fox cubs. Meanwhile, sleep seems to be on the agenda for Tinky Winky, Dipsy, Laa-Laa and Po, so it's up to the Voice Trumpets to wake them up. Featuring: Ivo and India Hayes
280	"Pavement Artist"	27 August 1999
The Teletubbies walk one by one in a line before the Magic Windmill spins and the Teletubbies watch a girl create pavement drawings with chalk, and perform a lively puddle dance. A rainbow appears in Teletubbyland. The Teletubbies do the Splashing dance before the sun giggles for Tubby Bye Bye. Featuring: Emma Williams
281	"Stick Insect"	22 November 1999
Tinky Winky comes out of a tree and says 'Eh-oh!' Dipsy pops up from a hill and says 'Eh-oh!' Laa laa also pops up from a hill and says 'Eh-oh!' Po comes out of a bush and says 'Eh-oh!' The Teletubbies pop up and come out of bushes and they all say 'Eh-oh!' They all stood together before the Magic Windmill spins and The Teletubbies watch a boy called Philip playing with his pet stick insects and then the Teletubbies admire the clouds in the sky Then they did the Bumping dance before the Sun baby giggled for Tubby Bye Bye. Featuring: Philip Taylor
282	"Colours – Brown"	23 November 1999
The Teletubbies listen to a voice trumpet say "How Now Brown Cow", then they watch some children explore the colour brown. In Teletubbyland, the Lion and Bear play hide and seek before the Magic Windmill stops spinning and it is time for Tubby bye-bye. Featuring: The Children of Oxhey Infants School
283	"Catching Leaves"	24 November 1999
The Teletubbies watch Andy Brown and some children collecting autumn leaves, and Po catches Tinky Winky taking more than his fair share of Tubby Toast. Featuring: Andy Brown, Emily & Jack Baker, Jodie Wiltshire and Josh Reynolds
284	"Making a Den"	25 November 1999
The Teletubbies play inside and then watch two children make a den. A carpet appears in Teletubbyland. First, Laa-Laa steps onto the carpet and off the carpet, and then Po stands in the middle and then at the edge of the carpet. A Voice Trumpet even appears to tell them to step on and off the carpet. Then the carpet disappeared and then it's time for Tubby Bye-Bye. Featuring: Zoe Fischer and Anya Chomacki
285	"Torches"	26 November 1999
Laa Laa appears and disappears until the Magic Windmill spins and the Tubbies watch some children playing with torches, and then they play a game of chase. The Teletubbies chased the Noo Noo around the Tubbytronic Superdome. Featuring: Isobel Stocker and Jonti Siva-Jothy
286	"Maori Singing"	29 November 1999
Tinky Winky runs up and down before the Magic Windmill spins and the Teletubbies watch some children doing Maori singing. Then Po sings a song and the others join in one by one. The Teletubbies then have a big hug before the Sun Baby giggles for Tubby bye bye. Featuring: Kohanga Reo, London
287	"Badgers"	30 November 1999
Dipsy walks over the hills and past the trees and does a little dance before the Windmill spins. He runs off with the other Teletubbies to watch Andy Brown and two children look at badgers. Back in Teletubbyland, Dipsy goes outside and sits to watch things. Dipsy first watches the Windmill turning. Then, Dipsy watches rabbits playing. Next, Dipsy watches the trees blowing in the wind. Dipsy then heard Laa-Laa coming out of the house wearing the skirt. Laa-Laa then danced a lovely dance. Dipsy liked Laa-Laa's dance. Then, Dipsy heard Po coming. Po then sang a special song. Dipsy liked Po's special song. Dipsy then heard Tinky Winky coming. Tinky Winky started marching. Dipsy liked Tinky Winky's marching. Dipsy loves the other Teletubbies and calls out to them. They have a Big Hug before Tubby Bye-Bye. Featuring: Ivo and India Hayes
288	"Pumpkin Face"	1 December 1999
The Teletubbies are playing with their favorite things until the Magic Windmill spins and the Teletubbies watch a little girl put a face on a pumpkin. Then a pumpkin appears but it takes Dipsy's hat. Featuring: Alexandria Moses
289	"Hide and Seek"	2 December 1999
The Teletubbies watch a group of children play hide and seek, and then play their own hiding game. Featuring: The Children of Bartlemas Nursery School
290	"Getting Up in the Morning"	3 December 1999
The Teletubbies are sitting at the table when two Voice Trumpets rise and say Good Morning then the Magic Windmill spins and the Teletubbies watch some children getting up in the morning and The Teletubbies watch The Singing Man in the Pink House before the Teletubbies do a twisty dance and then it is time for "Tubby Bye-Bye." The Baby Sun then sets. Featuring: Frances and Fiona Bennell
291	"Game Drive"	6 December 1999
The Teletubbies observe children in a South African game reserve watching the animals. Tinky Winky and Po pull a wagon that appears in Teletubbyland, and Po pulls Tinky Winky all the way home. Featuring: Kallie Viljoen and Ricardo Goliath with Richard, Kitty, Danny and Gabriel Viljoen
292	"Colours – Red"	7 December 1999
Laa Laa and Po are asleep until the Noo Noo wakes them up and a Voice Trumpet comes up and sings Red. The Magic Windmill starts to spin and the Teletubbies watch some children explore the colour red. Po is sleeping and the Noo-Noo goes by. She wakes up when a voice trumpet starts singing about red. She makes some adjustments on the switch panel and all the lights change to rosy red. She continues to sing Red and the flowers and clouds turn rosy red until the Magic Windmill stops spinning for Tubby Bye-Bye. Featuring: The Children of Oxhey Infants School
293	"Going Up and Going Down"	8 December 1999
A voice trumpet rises and Laa-Laa and Dipsy play a going up and going down game. They then watch some children play a going up and going down game. Tinky Winky looks for Po but he can't find her Po follows him not knowing Po is right behind him. After that, the Magic Windmill then starts to spin just as the three magic ships come to Teletubbyland and sail around. The ships and the water disappear at the end and the Teletubbies head home just as the Magic Windmill stops spinning. The Teletubbies say "goodbye" during the Tubby Bye-Bye sequence and the baby sun sets. Featuring: The Children of Mortimer and Laygate Primary Schools, South Shields, Tyne & Wear
294	"Making Music"	9 December 1999
The Teletubbies do a dance before the Teletubbies watch two children making music with a saucepan. Tinky Winky hears a noise coming from inside the house and he goes inside to investigate. The noise was Po making Tubby Custard. There was a sound coming from inside again, so Dipsy went to see and it was Tinky Winky and Po jumping up and down on seats. Laa Laa heard a noise coming from the house and it was the other Teletubbies eating Tubby Custard. Featuring: Sarah and Georgina Holder
295	"Ducks"	10 December 1999
Inside Home Hill a voice trumpet makes quacking sounds, which Dipsy finds amusing. He rushes outside to fetch the Teletubbies to watch two children feeding some ducks. In Teletubbyland, the Teletubbies do the walking dance, before they watch a Magical Event of Little Bo Peep looks for her lost sheep. After the Little Bo Peep event has finished, the Magic Windmill stops spinning and it is time for Tubby Bye Bye. Featuring: Tanith, Jed and Mel Holdbrook
296	"Bagels"	13 December 1999
In Teletubbyland, The Teletubbies have fun going this way and that way, Afterwards, The Magic Windmill starts spinning and the Teletubbies rush off to watch a young girl helping her uncle to make bagels. Meanwhile, inside the Home Hill, Laa Laa comes in first to make Tubby Custard. After she make the Tubby Custard, she sit down to wait for the other Teletubbies to come in. Then, Po comes in to make Tubby Custard. After Po makes Tubby Custard, she sits at the table with Laa Laa. Po waits for 2 more Teletubbies to come in. Then Dipsy comes in next to make Tubby Custard. After he makes Tubby Custard, he sits at the table with Po and Laa Laa. They also waits for Tinky Winky to come in. Then Tinky Winky did come in last. He makes Tubby Custard, after he does, he sits at the table with Dipsy, Laa Laa and Po. Then it is time for the Teletubbies to eat their Tubby Custard. After they eat their Tubby Custard, they hug each other before Tubby Bye-Bye. Featuring: Romi Bachar and Yuval Edry
297	"Animal Rhythms"	14 December 1999
Dipsy and Laa-Laa discover a funny noise and then join the others to watch some children pretend to be animals. They watch the animals march through Teletubbyland and the Teletubbies dance a follow the leader dance. Then, it's time for "Tubby Bye-Bye." The Baby Sun then sets. Featuring: David Stickman, Children from Haydn Road Nursery, Nottingham
298	"Rosie's Hairdo"	15 December 1999
Dipsy leaves his hat behind, but when he comes to find it, the Noo-Noo has tidied up. Later, the Noo-Noo blows it out. The Teletubbies watch some children style their friend's hair. The Teletubbies say "Eh-Oh" game and then They watch The Magic Tree appearing in Teletubbyland and the Teletubbies do the Swinging dance before The "Tubby Bye-Bye" sequence takes place. Featuring: Rosie Fish, Zainab Sanusi, Kashif Kara James, Vaishali Ganda and MJ Harriott
299	"Sea Tractor"	16 December 1999
The Teletubbies stand on some hills until the windmill spins and they watch some children go for a ride on a sea tractor. Tinky- Winky, Dipsy, and Laa- Laa are eating Tubby Toast and Po goes for a ride on her scooter, and while she's riding, she sees Laa-Laa's ball, Dipsy's hat and Tinky Winky's bag. Featuring: Oscar & Ella Brentford, Caroline Porter, Harry & Lucy Cassidy
300	"Chameleon"	17 December 1999
Tinky Winky and Dipsy are standing on different hills. They hear Po coming and she arrives between the two hills. She asks Tinky Winky for a big hug and rushes up the hill to him. Then she asks Dipsy for a big hug and rushes up the other hill to Dipsy. Then the Teletubbies watch Michael, who lives in South Africa, as he looks for chameleons in his back garden. The Teletubbies play with Laa Laa's ball until it bounces away and they chase it throughout Teletubbyland. Featuring: Michael, Garth and Daphne Hardie

=== Season 4 (2000) ===
No.	Title	Original release date
301	"Mum's Portrait"	31 July 2000
The Teletubbies play games amongst the hills and watch a little girl painting a picture of her Mum. A book appears in Teletubbyland for Tinky Winky to read. The book shows Dipsy Jumping, Laa Laa hopping, Po rolling and Tinky Winky dancing and everything in the book actually happens. Featuring: Komal and Saroj Nayyar
302	"Gold and Silver"	1 August 2000
A Voice Trumpet rises and sings Po a nursery rhyme called I Had a Little Nut Tree. The Teletubbies watch some children making lots of different things using gold and silver. Laa-Laa decides to go for a walk and finds a beautiful golden tree with silver leaves. She fetches Tinky Winky, Dipsy and Po to see the gold and silver tree. They all think it's very beautiful. Featuring: The Children of Windmill Playgroup, Brixton
303	"Honky Tonk Piano"	2 August 2000
The Teletubbies pop up behind a hill and then watch a boy and his mom play the piano. A piano appears in Teletubbyland. Tinky Winky and Po have great fun bashing away at the keys, but when they play nicely, they play a lovely tune. Featuring: Nathaniel Poole and Hill Briggs
304	"Running"	3 August 2000
Dipsy runs all over Teletubbyland before the Magic Windmill spins and the Teletubbies watch a video of some children running on a beach. Dipsy is running again and Tinky-Winky saw Dipsy running, then Laa Laa saw Dipsy Running, then Po saw Dipsy running. Noo Noo also saw Dipsy running. The Teletubbies wondered why Dipsy was running. Dipsy was running because he loves to run and then all the Teletubbies run all over Teletubbyland. The Teletubbies do The Stretching dance before Tubby Bye-Bye. U.S. Version: Dipsy runs all over Teletubbyland before the Magic Windmill spins and the Teletubbies watch a video of some children running on a beach. Dipsy is running again and Tinky-Winky saw Dipsy running, then Laa Laa saw Dipsy Running, then Po saw Dipsy running. Noo Noo also saw Dipsy running. The Teletubbies wondered why Dipsy was running. Dipsy was running because he loves to run and then all the Teletubbies run all over Teletubbyland. The Teletubbies do The Falling Down dance and the Magic House appears before Tubby Bye-Bye. Featuring: The Children of Mortimer and Laygate Primary Schools, South Shields, Tyne & Wear
305	"Baby Elephant"	4 August 2000
Po was walking over Teletubbyland before she rushed off to get the other Teleubbies to watch two children watching a herd of elephants in a safari park. The Teletubbies watch Little Bo Peep search for her sheep before flying away into the sky. The Teletubbies do The Running Away Dance before Tubby Bye-Bye. Featuring: Channing Carr and Lisa du Plooy
306	"Watering the Garden"	7 August 2000
The Teletubbies meet each other and say hello to each other before the Magic Windmill spins and the Teletubbies watch some children watering the garden. After some activities, they watch the Magic Tree and the doves before doing a Splashing dance before the "Tubby Bye-Bye" sequence takes place. Featuring: Zoe Hazan and Omar Hussein
307	"Treasure Box"	8 August 2000
The Teletubbies dance around the Superdome before the Magic Windmill spins and shows a child and a baby playing with a treasure box and Dipsy is followed by a magic musical cloud. Featuring: Zoem Sophie and Susie Fischer
308	"This Is Our Park"	9 August 2000
The Teletubbies play and jump around the House before the Windmill starts spinning. The Teletubbies watch some children playing in the park, they show us their quiet garden and the playground with slides, swings and a see saw. In Teletubbyland, a magic See Saw appears from far away, Dipsy and Laa play on the See Saw. A Voice Trumpet sings "See Saw Marjory Daw". Then it's Tinky Winky and Po's turn to play on the See Saw but Tinky Winky is too heavy to play with Po on the See Saw, so Dipsy and Laa Laa help by pushing the See Saw up and down. Then the See Saw disappears and the Teletubbies have a Big Hug. Featuring: Children of St Mary's Nursery, North Kensington
309	"Grasshoppers"	10 August 2000
Dipsy walks along and bumps into a tree and a Voice Trumpet pops up and makes a sound of a grasshopper. After watching Andy Brown and some children hunting for grasshoppers, the Teletubbies play a jumping game in Teletubbyland, Tinky Winky jumps over his bag, Dipsy jumps over some flowers, Laa Laa jumps over the path and Po jumps all the way over the House and they then do the Jumping dance before Tubby Bye Bye. Featuring: Komal Nayyar and Holly & Lauren Probert
310	"My Mum's Breakfast"	11 August 2000
Laa-Laa is asleep when a voice trumpet rises and plays very loud music. Laa-Laa doesn't like and tells it to shhh. Soon, the voice trumpet plays a soft song and Laa-Laa is asleep again. But the Magic Windmill starts to spin and it wakes up Laa-Laa, so she runs outside to fetch the other Teletubbies and they watch a girl make breakfast for her mom. Laa-Laa and Po are asleep until Po says good morning to Laa-Laa and Laa-Laa says good morning to Po and they do it again and again. Outside, Dipsy walks past while inside, Laa-Laa and Po say good morning to Dipsy and come out to say it to him. Dipsy then says good morning to Laa-Laa and Po. The cycle repeats until Dipsy, Laa-Laa and Po have a big hug. Then, Tinky Winky is walking when Dipsy, Laa, and Po say good morning to Tinky Winky and Tinky Winky says good morning to Dipsy, Laa-Laa, and Po. They do until they fall down with laughter before Tubby Bye-Bye. Featuring: Jenny and Anne Huxley-Golden
311	"Ten Pin Bowling"	14 August 2000
Laa Laa is playing with her ball until the Magic Windmill spins and the Teletubbies watch two girls go ten pin bowling. Laa-Laa plays with her ball again. It begins to rain, so Laa-Laa plays with her ball indoors, not very carefully. It makes everybody fall over. Everyone is happy when the rain stops. Now Laa-Laa can play with her ball outside. Featuring: Jessica Brooks, Georgina & Sophie Cooper
312	"Llama"	15 August 2000
The Teletubbies link arms with each other and walk sideways before the Magic Windmill spins and the Teletubbies watch Oliver and his llama. Po makes everyone happy with her singing and dancing. Po is feeling happy, and when Dipsy sees that Po is happy, he is happy too. Featuring: Oliver Masters and Beverly Cornthwaite
313	"Asian Storyteller"	16 August 2000
The Teletubbies enjoy a big hug, before listening to a lady tell a story about four friends. She uses her hands to help tell the story. The Teletubbies do the Stretching dance and watch The Animal Parade as it takes place in Teletubbyland before the sun baby giggles for Tubby Bye Bye. Featuring: Vinata Godbole, Radhika Bali, Anuska Mehta, Annabel Johnstone, Neiko Ali and Anthony Spiers-Fitzgerald
314	"Up the Hill"	17 August 2000
Tinky Winky comes down the slide before the Magic Windmill spins and the Teletubbies watch two girls climb a hill and look at the view. In Teletubbyland, Po looks for Tinky Winky over the hills, between the trees and along the path, but she cannot see him. Then Po sees a big hill, so she climbs up and up to look around. Now she can see Tinky Winky, coming out of the house. Featuring: Fiona & Frances Bennell & Melvyn Kinnaird
315	"Dog Kennel"	18 August 2000
A voice trumpet makes woofing sounds, which the Teletubbies copy again and again. They watch two children painting a dog kennel. After some activities, the Teletubbies watch The Singing Man in the Pink House before the Magic Windmill stops spinning. Then the Teletubbies do a Tip Toe dance before Tubby Bye Bye. Featuring: Leah Hocker, Stefano Perez and Benson the Dog
316	"Scrapbook"	21 August 2000
Tinky Winky and Po walk together until the Magic Windmill spins and the Teletubbies watch a little boy show his friend his scrapbook. Tinky Winky puts Dipsy's hat inside his bag. Then Noo Noo sucks up Tinky Winky's bag, with Dipsy's hat inside it, into his tummy then Tinky Winky and Dipsy chase the Noo Noo and the Noo Noo eventually returns the hat and bag. Featuring: Sam Marshall and Kashif Kara James
317	"Collecting Stones"	22 August 2000
The Teletubbies sit down for Tubby Toast. After they've eaten, the Tubby Toaster malfunctions, and some more toast lands on their plates. They eat that, and more toast lands again. Tinky Winky is full up, so he gives his to Dipsy. Dipsy is full up, so he gives his to Laa-Laa. Laa-Laa is full up so she gives hers to Po. Then Po is full up, so the Noo Noo eats her Tubby Toast. The Magic Windmill spins and the Teletubbies watch some children collecting stones. the Teletubbies then watch The Three Ships sail through Teletubbyland before the Magic Windmill stops spinning and it is time for Tubby Bye Bye. Featuring: Luke & Dawn Adcock, Paige & Sarah James, Occeta Nwalloka and Jack McGee
318	"Grandad's Motorbike"	23 August 2000
Po is riding on her scooter before the Magic Windmill spins and the Teletubbies watch a little boy going for a ride in his grandad's motorbike side-car. In Teletubbyland, Po goes to see Tinky Winky, Dipsy and Laa Laa on her scooter. Then she goes home on her scooter. Featuring: Jamie Hancock and Sammy Miller
319	"Firefighter"	24 August 2000
Noo Noo is hovering about and Dipsy comes then the Voice Trumpet appears and makes a siren sound before the Magic Windmill spins and the Teletubbies watch a little boy whose dad is a firefighter. A beautiful fountain appears, and Laa-Laa sings a fountain song. The fountain plays music like Laa-Laa's song. When she sings high, the fountain gets higher, and when she sings lower, the water gets lower too. Featuring: Jabril and Mark Taylor
320	"Goats"	25 August 2000
The Teletubbies meet up and say 'Eh-oh!'. They have a big hug before the Magic Windmill spins and the Teletubbies watch two children and their goats. The Tap Dancing Teddy Bear appears in Teletubbyland. The Magic Windmill stops spinning even though it was not time for Tubby Bye Bye, then the Teletubbies decide to sing a special song. They sing along the path, over the hills, at the Table and in Bed and then they sing to sleep. Featuring: Tanith, Jed and Mel Holdbrook
321	"Buying a Sari"	11 December 2000
Laa Laa has a sleep in her bed but the Magic Windmill spins and the Teletubies watch a little girl going to the shops to buy a sari. Meanwhile, the Noo Noo is tidying up the Teletubbies' blankets, but Po doesn't want the Noo Noo to tidy up hers. Featuring: Aquila Haq and Farzana Islam
322	"Jack and the Beanstalk"	12 December 2000
Tinky Winky and Po come out of the house and have a big hug. They go in and out of the house a few times before the Magic Windmill spins and the Teletubbies watch a little girl read the story of Jack and the Beanstalk. After that, a Voice Trumpet appears and sings the rhyme Fee-Fi-Fo-Fum, a magical tree grows and the Teletubbies watch it before heading home just as the Magic Windmill stops spinning and it is time for Tubby Bye-Bye. Featuring: Jenny Huxley-Golden
323	"Going In and Coming Out"	13 December 2000
Laa-Laa is playing indoors with her ball, but the Noo Noo catches it and tidies it up. Laa-Laa chases the Noo Noo till she gets her ball back. The Magic Windmill spins and The Tap dancing teddy bear appears. Laa Laa carries on playing with her ball but Noo Noo catches it and tidies it up. Then the Magic Windmill spins and the Teletubbies watch some kids going in and coming out. The Teletubbies do the Twisty dance before the "Tubby Bye-Bye" sequence takes place next and The Baby Sun sets. Featuring: Henry & Karen Crossman, Giulia Gibbon, Maria & Theresa Mellor, Matthew Paine, Amelia & Vikki Paull, Alex Phelps, Georgina Phillips
324	"Seals"	14 December 2000
The Teletubbies come out of Home Hill and say 'Eh-oh!' before the Magic Windmill spins and the Teletubbies watch some children with seals. In order to see what everyone else is doing, Tinky Winky looks across Teletubbyland from the top of the dome. He sees Laa-Laa skipping, Po marching and Dipsy dancing. Featuring: Kelly & Rory Fish, Khanya Moyo and Children of The Children's Workshop, Cape Town, South Africa
325	"Move with the Drum"	15 December 2000
Some children have fun moving to drum music. While the Teletubbies are sleeping, Tinky Winky sings a loud song and wakes them up. Later, Po sings a song so quietly that it sends the Teletubbies back to sleep. Featuring: David Stickman, Children from Haydn Road Nursery, Nottingham
326	"Puppies"	18 December 2000
The Teletubbies walk about Teletubbyland in a huddle, before watching a little girl with lots of puppies. Little Bo Peep has lost her sheep and comes to Teletubbyland to find them. The Magic Windmill stops spinning and then the Teletubbies dance a round-and-round dance before Tubby Bye-Bye. Featuring: Emily, Holly and Debbie Brown
327	"On Top and Underneath"	19 December 2000
It begins with the rabbit song. Tinky Winky sees Dipsy on top of the house. The Magic Windmill spins and the Teletubbies watch some children playing an 'on top and underneath' game. The Teletubbies play their own version of the game – standing on a top of a hill and underneath clouds. Po's scooter comes along and Dipsy's hat is on top of Po's scooter. The Teletubbies had a rest in their beds and they woke up and had a big hug before the Sun baby giggled for Tubby Bye Bye. Featuring: Children and Friends of the Little Folk Playgroup, Dublin, Ireland
328	"Barrel Organ"	20 December 2000
Po comes into Home Hill and says Eh-oh when a voice trumpet rises and plays barrel organ music before the Magic Windmill spins and the Teletubbies watch some children who have a barrel organ. A man turns the handle and the children dance. The Teletubbies get their own music box. Tinky Winky turns the handle and the box plays some lovely music. Po dances in time to the tune. Featuring: Nigel Winfield and The Children of Christchurch School, London
329	"Sleep Over"	21 December 2000
The Teletubbies walk from different directions and meet in the middle before the Magic Windmill spins and the Teletubbies watch a girl visiting her cousin and the Teletubbies take their favourite things to bed with them. Laa-Laa, however, struggles to fit herself and her ball into bed. Laa Laa's ball goes flying all over Teletubbyland. She eventually gets her ball back. Laa Laa loves her ball and Teletubbies love each other very much. Featuring: Kaiya Shah and Riyan and Rita Shah
330	"Afro-Caribbean Vegetables"	22 December 2000
The Teletubbies sit down to eat Tubby Custard, but they stop to watch children buy different sorts of vegetables. The Teletubbies discover that the sky is blue, the grass is green and that the flowers are red, but Po and the other Teletubbies ask the question – what colour is Tubby Custard? (which is Pink) Then Po eats all the Tubby Custard. Po loves Tubby Custard. Featuring: Daniel Evans, Nico Grossi, Pele Lewis, Owen & Carol Mitchell

=== Season 5 (2001) ===
No.	Title	Original release date
331	"Trikes"	1 January 2001
Po rides into Home Hill on her scooter and Dipsy comes down the slide in his hat. Dipsy and Po have a big hug and the Magic Windmill spins and the Teletubbies watch children have fun riding their trikes. Po is riding her scooter and the other Teletubbies want to have a go. Dipsy thinks the scooter is too slow, Tinky Winky thinks the scooter is too fast, and Laa-Laa thinks the scooter is too wobbly. Featuring: Children from Taunton Street Children's Centre, Manchester
332	"Our Story"	2 January 2001
The Teletubbies pop up and run off to watch some children tell a story with their drawings. Laa Laa goes for a walk, and as she walks she sings a song about what she sees, she sings about a tree, a rabbit and a cloud. When she sees the Teletubbies she sings her song to them. Featuring: Ayshah & Shamas Aziz, Mark Westwood and Lilly Ainsworth
333	"Jabadao"	3 January 2001
The Teletubbies meet up and say 'Eh-oh!' and walk away in different ways They come back and the Magic Windmill spins. The Teletubbies watch some children play with Jabadao's in the wind. It is very windy in Teletubbyland. The wind blows Tinky Winky's bag, Dipsy's hat, Laa-Laa's ball and Po off her scooter. The Teletubbies go indoors, but the wind follows them inside and blows on the Tubby Toast and Tubby Blankets. The Teletubbies do the Dizzy dance before the Baby sun giggles for Tubby bye bye. Featuring: Children from Parklands Children's Centre, Seacroft, Leeds
334	"Silvie's Fish Pond"	4 January 2001
Dipsy and Laa Laa hold hands and say 'Eh-oh' before the Magic Windmill spins and the Teletubbies watch Silvie doing stuff with a fish pond. Dipsy accidentally drops his hat in a puddle making it all wet, but the Baby Sun soon helps to dry it out. Featuring: Silvie Ciantar, Alison Ciantar
335	"Bluebells"	5 January 2001
The Teletubbies pop up over some Hills and say Eh-Oh to each other, the Windmill spins and they watch some children look at Bluebells. In Teletubbyland, Po is out for a walk when a Magic Bluebell appears from Far Away. She shows it to Laa Laa and then three more appear. They show the Bluebells to Tinky Winky and Dipsy and then Teletubbyland starts filling with lots of Bluebells. Dipsy goes for a walk among the Bluebells, Laa Laa dances among the Bluebells, Tinky Winky smells the Bluebells and Po sings a Bluebell song. Then the Bluebells start to disappear, the Teletubbies have a Big Hug before Tubby Bye Bye. Featuring: Children of the Elsley Primary School, Wembley
336	"Asian Storyteller (The Fox)"	8 January 2001
Po looks for the other Teletubbies but she can't find them, so she shouts Big Hug and they all have a Big Hug. The Teletubbies listen to an Asian Storyteller about a cunning fox. Later, The Lion and the Bear play hide-and-seek and the Magic Windmill stops spinning. The "Tubby Bye-Bye" sequence takes place. Featuring: Vinata Godbole, Radhika Bali, Anuska Mehta, Annabel Johnstone, Neiko Ali and Anthony Spiers-Fitzgerald
337	"Paddling by the Sea"	9 January 2001
The Teletubbies go run around a say hello and the windmill starts spinning. They started to say "Uh Oh!" and they rushed off. The Teletubbies watch a group of children playing in the sea. Then in Teletubbyland, the Teletubbies jump inside the Home Hill, the Magic Windmill announces that the three ships are sailing through Teletubbyland. After that, The Magic Windmill stops spinning and the Teletubbies do a splashing dance in the puddle outside Home Hill. It is time for Tubby Bye-Bye. Featuring: Luke Adcock, Paige James, Jack & Karen McGee and Caroline, Chika & Osita Nwaoloko
338	"Stretching Words"	10 January 2001
Noo-Noo sucks up, then Po slides down the slide and falling on her back before the Magic Windmill spins. The Teletubbies watch some children having fun with a man nicknamed "Stickman" who asks for a names of words and asks the children to stretch words and sounds longer. "Stickman" also joins in. Laa-Laa is out for a walk. Laa-Laa then says 'Eh-Oh!' to the audience when a voice trumpet rises and says a funny joke. This makes Laa-Laa laugh and laugh. Po appears and Laa-Laa tells Po her joke. Po finds the joke very funny.Tinky Winky appears and Laa-Laa and Po tell him the joke. Tinky Winky finds the joke very funny as well. Dipsy then appears and wonders what the other Teletubbies are doing. Tinky Winky tells Dipsy about Laa-Laa's joke but Dipsy does not find it funny. Dipsy dances and all the Teletubbies laugh. Then they have a big hug before Tubby Bye-Bye. Featuring: David Stickman, Children from Haydn Road Nursery, Nottingham
339	"Monkeys"	11 January 2001
Noo-Noo is making slurping noises before the Teletubbies enter the house and bounce funnily before the Magic Windmill spins and the Teletubbies see some children in South Africa watching monkeys. The Teletubbies do the Bumping dance then they eat some very bouncy Tubby Toast and become very bouncy too. Featuring: Lwando Cuka, Matt Fermor, Luke Johnson, Siphosomzi Sipoyo and Bram Thorpe
340	"Obstacle Course"	12 January 2001
The Teletubbies walk one by one and then they meet before the Magic Windmill spins and they watch some children on an obstacle course. The Teletubbies bounce up and down up on their seats then go on their own course to bed. Featuring: Louis Cross, Jo Martin and Zain Shah
341	"Animal Plates"	15 January 2001
Some voice trumpets rise and make funny animal noises. The Teletubbies laugh as they copy the noises. The Teletubbies then watch some children making animal pictures by piercing polystyrene plates with pencils. The Teletubbies jump but it is time for Tubby Bye Bye. Featuring: Ashley Clish, Letitia Henry, Aimee Timms, Emma Townsend and Eros Vlandhos
342	"Rumble Tumble Fun"	16 January 2001
The Teletubbies walk in a single file and they say 'eh-oh' and they all fall down one by one before the Magic Windmill spins and the Teletubbies watch some children playing on a huge pile of cushions. A bouncy cushion then appears in Teletubbyland, and they all take turns to bounce. Featuring: Joshua Anderson, Rico Finlayson, Sade & Ruby John, Maya & Joy Kincaid, Tara Love and Sade Rowland
343	"Bird Bath"	17 January 2001
Dipsy and Laa Laa have tubby toast, then they fall over. The Magic Windmill spins and the Teletubbies see some children who are watching birds in a bird bath. Dipsy and Laa Laa go in and out of their home before the Magic Windmill spins again and The Magic Tree appears. Afterwards, the Magic Windmill stops spinning. The Teletubbies do a Rocking Dance before Tubby Bye Bye. Featuring: Sean & Aimee McCarney
344	"Indian Dancing"	18 January 2001
Po fetches the other Teletubbies to watch some girls perform an Indian dance. Dipsy then dances a very special dance. Laa Laa comes down the path with Po. Dipsy showed Laa Laa and Po his special dance while Laa Laa and Po play on the control panels. Dipsy danced his special dance down on the path. Meanwhile, the other Teletubbies thought that Dipsy's dance was very special. Featuring: Chitraleka Bolar & the Indian Dance Class at Midland Art Centre
345	"Sitting and Standing"	19 January 2001
The Teletubbies play a sitting and standing game outside before watching a group of people sitting and standing. Later, Po is on her scooter and she moves Dipsy's hat out of the way. Dipsy accidentally sits on his hat. Featuring: The Children, Families & Friends of Mortimer Primary and Marine Park Schools, Tyne and Wear
346	"My Pretend Friend"	22 January 2001
Laa-Laa comes out of the Home Hill, does a little dance and calls the other Teletubbies for a Big Hug. They stop to watch two little girls making a pretend friend out of old clothes. The Teletubbies dance a bendy dance and watch The Tap Dancing Teddy Bear on the carousel. Afterwards, the Magic Windmill stops spinning for Tubby Bye Bye. Featuring: Ella Pevsner and Ellen Sandford O'Neill
347	"Cricket"	23 January 2001
The Teletubbies walk in sideways, then run off to watch a little boy play cricket with his dad. In Teletubbyland, Tinky Winky runs away with Laa-Laa's ball. Laa-Laa chases after him, through the house, over the hills and behind the trees. Then Tinky Winky sees his bag. Featuring: Nishant and Paresh Patel
348	"Mud Hole"	24 January 2001
It's time for Tubby Toast. Po and Tinky Winky are so excited that they fall over. They join Dipsy and Laa-Laa to watch two children dig a big mud hole in a backyard. Some mud appears in Teletubbyland, and the Teletubbies play around in it. Laa-Laa has muddy feet and Dipsy has a muddy bottom. They find this very funny! Featuring: Danny and Jess McDermott
349	"My Home is a Boat"	25 January 2001
The Teletubbies come out of the house together but they cannot fit. They squeeze back into the house and come out before the Magic Windmill spins and the Teletubbies watch two little girls who live with their mum and dad on a boat, and they show us inside the boat. The Teletubbies leave their house and Tinky Winky and Po go left. Dipsy and Laa-Laa also go right. They walk round the back of the house, through the doors and out of the front over and over again. The Singing Man in the Pink House event also appears. After The Singing Man in the Pink House disappears, there is time for the Happy dance before Tubby Bye Bye. Featuring: Hugh, Keiri, Nephele, Romilly and Thalia Swann
350	"Grandad's Pigeons"	26 January 2001
The Teletubbies make raspberry noises before watching a little boy called Connor with his grandfather's pigeons. The Teletubbies come out of their house and they bumped into each other before going out to play across Teletubbyland. The Teletubbies then went home again and went out to play again. The Teletubbies went home again and they come out of their home yet again. Teletubbies love each other very much. Featuring: Connor and George Morris
351	"Action Story"	29 January 2001
Laa-Laa and Po come out of the house, say "Eh-oh" and have a dance. The Teletubbies watch some children pretend to be helicopters and then imagine that they're at the beach. Tinky-Winky, Dipsy and Laa-Laa look for Po. Dipsy looks for Po in the flowers, Tinky-Winky looks for Po in the house. Luckily Laa-Laa found Po. She was sleeping under a big tree. So Laa-Laa told Tinky-Winky and Dipsy the story of Po. She said that far far away, over the hills, there was a big tree, and under the tree Po was lying fast asleep. They follow Laa-Laa to come and see and they saw her. Later, Po wakes up and says "Eh-Oh". They all have a big hug before Tubby Bye-Bye. Featuring: Beth Adams, Ishmail Daley, Sarah Heydon and Alexandra Paynter from Oxford Youth Dance
352	"Rickshaw"	30 January 2001
The Noo-Noo is tidying up the house and Dipsy comes down the slide. The Teletubbies go to do the Walking Dance, then the Teletubbies watch some children riding on rickshaw pulled by a man on a bicycle. Po rides her Scooter very fast around the House, then she rides it outside, she zooms past Tinky Winky, Dipsy and Laa Laa and they fall over. Po goes very fast on her Scooter, but when she goes up a hill, her Scooter lifts up off the ground and into the sky. Po flies all over Teletubbyland, she flies over the House, some trees and the other Teletubbies. After flying over Teletubbyland, Po begins to float down again, but as she floats down she crashes into a big bush and gets stuck. The other Teletubbies can't find her, then she jumps out of the bush and they all have a Big Hug. Featuring: Nigel Winfield and Children from Christchurch School, East London
353	"My Dad's a Policeman"	31 January 2001
Laa Laa and Po walk sideways in one direction, then Dipsy and Tinky Winky walk sideways. The Teletubbies meet up before the Magic Windmill spins. They then watch father as a policeman showing off his uniform and badges. The Teletubbies are sitting at a table when they hear a funny noise. Featuring: Danny, David, Laura and Sarena Phillips
354	"Dragonflies"	1 February 2001
In Teletubbyland, Tinky Winky is looking for the other Teletubbies. He can't see any of them so he shouts out "Big Hug!" and all the Teletubbies come running for a big hug. Then the Teletubbies rushed off to watch some children watch dragonflies. Then they do The All Sorts Dance before heading inside the Home Hill. They hear the Magic Windmill spinning and rush outside to see the Magical Event of the Lion and Bear playing their hide and seek game in Teletubbyland. After the creatures disappear, the Teletubbies say "All Gone!" and run away as the Magic Windmill stops spinning. The "Tubby Bye-Bye" sequence takes place and The Baby Sun sets. Featuring: Hannah Clements, Ciaran Houston, Harry Watkins and Ryan Wood
355	"African Dance"	2 February 2001
Tinky Winky and Laa-Laa go in and out of their home (bumping their behinds and their tummies while giving big hugs) before the Magic Windmill spins and the Teletubbies watch The Animal Parade. Afterwards, the Magic Windmill stops spinning for some reason, though it is not time for Tubby Bye-Bye. Dipsy and Po go in and out of their home (doing the same thing Tinky-Winky and Laa-Laa did before) before the Magic Windmill starts spinning again and they watch some children dance an African dance. The Teletubbies perform a skipping dance and The "Tubby Bye-Bye" sequence takes place. Featuring: The Children from Umthombo Theatre Group, Plettenberg Bay, South Africa
356	"Washing the Goat"	5 February 2001
The Teletubbies run in different directions and say 'Eh-oh!' before the Magic Windmill spins and the Teletubbies watch a group of children washing their goat in the river. In Teletubbyland it's time for Tubby Custard. Tinky Winky, Dipsy and Laa-Laa spill custard on themselves. Po didn't spill any custard, but when she sits down to eat it, she spills it over the table. The Noo Noo tidies up. The Teletubbies love each other very much. Then The Magic Windmill spins, the Teletubbies say "Uh-Oh!" they run outside the front door, the Magic Windmill stops spinning and it is time for Tubby Bye-Bye. Featuring: The Children of Khandas Village, India
357	"Floating Boat"	6 February 2001
Tinky Winky is asleep but he gets woken up by the Magic Windmill spinning. The Teletubbies watch children making a boat as they then put it in a paddling pool to see if it will float. Tinky-Winky's bag falls in a puddle, and as he watches it, the bag floats from side to side and all around the puddle. Tinky Winky feels like floating too, so he dances a floaty dance. Featuring: Children from Bartlemas Nursery School, Oxford
358	"Squeezing"	7 February 2001
Laa-Laa comes through to door and joins the others to watch some children squeezing things. A squeezy tube appears in Teletubbyland. Laa-Laa squeezes the tube and paint comes out onto Tinky Winky's handbag and Dipsy's hat. All the Teletubbies then get very messy! Featuring: Children from The Nursery Play Group, Sherman Labour Hall, Ealing and Happy Child Nurseries, Kilburn
359	"Violin (Spain)"	8 February 2001
Po is eating her Tubby custard but the Magic Windmill spins and the Teletubbies watch a Spanish girl play the violin for her friends. In Teletubbyland they watch Po dance, before joining in. Featuring: Ines Vega with Marta Vega, Veronica & Gonzalo Golan and Marta Cruces
360	"Crazy Golf"	9 February 2001
The Teletubbies pop up and say 'Eh-oh!' before the Magic Windmill spins and the Teletubbies watch a young boy playing Crazy Golf. The Teletubbies play a Hiding Game, behind some trees, then the Windmill starts to spin and the Dancing Bear appears inside the stage, the Teletubbies do the Falling Down Dance before Tubby Bye Bye. Featuring: Jalen Moses and Monique Montgomery
361	"Tabla (India)"	12 February 2001
The Teletubbies pop up from behind the hill and rush off to see a little Indian boy playing on a drum called a tabla. In Teletubbyland, it's time for Tubby Toast. Po eats Tinky Winky's Tubby Toast and Tinky-Winky eats Po's Tubby Toast. Their game is spoilt when Noo-Noo comes and clears everything away. Featuring: Gandhar and Ram Deshpande
362	"Hanging Out the Washing"	13 February 2001
Noo Noo is making slurping noises when Laa Laa comes down the slide before the Magic Windmill spins and the Teletubbies watch children hanging out their washing. Tinky-Winky, Laa-Laa and Po are out walking together when a clothes line appears. There are clothes hanging from the line. Tinky Winky wears the socks, Po wears the vest and Laa-Laa wears the pants. The Teletubbies love wearing clothes. The Teletubbies do the Rocking Dance before Tubby Bye-Bye. Featuring: Madeleine Jeapes and Sophia Scale
363	"Picking Chilies (Spain)"	14 February 2001
Noo Noo is hovering about when the Teletubbies enter Home Hill for a big hug before the Magic Windmill spins and the Teletubbies watch Spanish children picking chillies. In Teletubbyland, the Tubby Toaster isn't working properly, and it became engulfed in smoke and Tubby Toast flies everywhere. Tinky-Winky gathers the toast up in his bag and goes to find the others. When he opens his bag, Tubby Toast flies out all over Teletubbyland, then there's tubby toast for everyone. Featuring: Marcos & Lorena Suarez, Brais Couto, Inez Vega, Noelia Lareo & Veronica Golan
364	"Girl in the Back Garden"	15 February 2001
Tinky Winky finds Po behind the hill, and Po finds Laa-Laa on another hill, and Laa-Laa has found Dipsy behind the tree! All the Teletubbies were found each other for a big hug before watching a little girl read her sister a story that she has written and illustrated herself. It's called 'The Girl In The Back Garden'. Little Bo Peep has lost her sheep and comes to Teletubbyland to find them. before the Voice trumpet rises for Tubby Bye Bye. Featuring: Emmajean & Rebecca Carwood
365	"Bubbles (Russia)"	16 February 2001
The Teletubbies come into Home Hill one by one and say 'Eh-oh!' before the Magic Windmill spins and the Teletubbies watch some Russian children blowing bubbles. The Tubby Custard Machine makes Tubby Custard Bubbles. The Noo-Noo tidies the mess up and they come out of the Tubbytronic Superdome into the sky before Tubby Bye-Bye. Featuring: Youth Theatrical Studio "Umka"

== Revival series (2015–2018) ==
=== Season 1 (2015) ===
No. overall	No. in series	Title	Original release date	UK viewers (millions)
366	1	"Making Friends"	9 November 2015	0.70
The Teletubbies say "eh-oh" to each other in turn and say "eh-oh" to the flowers while the children in "Tummy Tales" make friendship circles out of handprints.
367	2	"Watering Can"	10 November 2015	0.54
Po waters lots of different objects with a watering can so that they grow. When the watering can disappears and everything returns to its normal size, The Teletubbies celebrate with a splashy puddle dance. A child in "Tummy Tales" waters tomatoes on an allotment.
368	3	"Up and Down"	11 November 2015	0.55
When the Tubby Phone rings, Dipsy goes down the slide to answer it then back up again. The Teletubbies have fun doing the Dipsy phone dance and watch a "Tummy Tale" about a boy travelling up and down in a lift.
369	4	"Favourite Things"	12 November 2015	N/A
Tinky-Winky, Dipsy and Po have their favourite things to play with but Laa-Laa doesn't have her ball. The others help her to find it. The Teletubbies then watch a "Tummy Tale" about a boy and his favourite thing – a bike.
370	5	"Babies"	13 November 2015	0.59
The Teletubbies eat tubby custard and ride the custard train around their home. A child in "Tummy Tales" tries to make his baby sister laugh.
371	6	"Hiding"	16 November 2015	N/A
Tinky-Winky keeps standing in the way when Laa-Laa is trying to look at the flowers. The Teletubbies watch a "Tummy Tale" about playing hide and seek.
372	7	"Bubbles"	17 November 2015	N/A
The tubby custard machine is making lots of tubby custard bubbles so The Teletubbies have fun chasing and popping them, just like the children in "Tummy Tales".
373	8	"Musical Box"	18 November 2015	N/A
The Teletubbies watch a grandma showing her grandson an old music box and Tinky Winky and Po play with a music box too.
374	9	"Puddles"	19 November 2015	N/A
It's raining in Teletubbyland so the Teletubbies spend the day eating toast and splashing in puddles, just like the children in "Tummy Tales".
375	10	"Wake Up Time!"	20 November 2015	N/A
Po needs more sleep before waking up for an energetic Tubby Phone dance. In "Tummy Tales" children enjoy acting out the nursery song, Sleeping Bunnies.
376	11	"Windy Day"	23 November 2015	N/A
It's a windy day in Teletubbyland and Dipsy's hat blows away – oh no! Po helps Dipsy to get his hat back, while, in "Tummy Tales", children have fun playing on a windy beach.
377	12	"Bumps!"	24 November 2015	N/A
The Teletubbies have fun bumping into each other and watch children in "Tummy Tales" riding on bumper cars.
378	13	"Muddy Footprints"	25 November 2015	N/A
Laa Laa leaves muddy footprints on a rug but magically makes them disappear by singing. Meanwhile, in "Tummy Tales" the children enjoy a squelchy walk through mud with bare feet.
379	14	"Bouncy Ball"	26 November 2015	N/A
Laa Laa's ball makes a mess in home dome where the other Teletubbies have just sat down to eat yummy bowls of Tubbycustard. In "Tummy Tales", the children blow up a big bouncy ball and play with it in the park.
380	15	"Roundy Round"	27 November 2015	N/A
Tinky Winky, Dipsy, Laa Laa and Po do a roundy round dance and watch children in "Tummy Tales" ride a carousel that also goes round and round.

=== Season 2 (2016) ===
No. overall	No. in series	Title	Original release date
381	16	"New Toy"	18 January 2016
The children in "Tummy Tales" play pass the parcel whilst the Dup Dup delivers toys for the Teletubbies to play with.
382	17	"Sing Song"	19 January 2016
Laa Laa makes up a lovely song and sings it with the other Teletubbies. A children's choir sings in "Tummy Tales".
383	18	"Messy Fun"	20 January 2016
The Teletubbies get very messy when the tubby custard machine takes them on a tubby custard ride which splats tubby custard everywhere. The children in "Tummy Tales" have lots of messy fun at the park.
384	19	"Silly Sausages"	21 January 2016
Tinky Winky, Laa Laa and Po laugh themselves silly with a joke but when they tell it to Dipsy he doesn't laugh. In "Tummy Tales", some children have fun being silly in the park.
385	20	"Red"	22 January 2016
A red balloon floats into Teletubbyland and Po leads the tubby phone dance. Po shows the balloon to the others and some children play in a room full of red balloons in "Tummy Tales".
386	21	"Reflections"	25 January 2016
The Teletubbies say eh-oh to their reflections in a puddle and Dipsy's hat falls in and gets wet. The sun comes out to play and some children say hello to their own reflections in "Tummy Tales".
387	22	"Big Dance"	26 January 2016
As the children in "Tummy Tales" dance together on a colourful dance floor, the Teletubbies do a new dance. First in pairs and then all together.
388	23	"Train Ride"	27 January 2016
Po gets on the tubby custard ride and makes lots of tubby custard. Po shares the custard with Tinky Winky, Dipsy and Laa-Laa and in "Tummy Tales", the children have a ride on a steam train.
389	24	"Wait For It!"	28 January 2016
The Teletubbies wait for tubby toast, then wait for the Tubby Phone. In "Tummy Tales", a boy waits to cross the road with his granddad and then waits for the bus.
390	25	"Snowball"	29 January 2016
It's a cold day in Teletubbyland – so cold that it is snowing! The Teletubbies find a big snowball and do a snowball dance before watching a group of children in "Tummy Tales" make a caterpillar out of snow.
391	26	"Packing"	1 February 2016
Tinky Winky puts Dipsy's hat in the bag – then Noo Noo hoovers them both up! The children in "Tummy Tales" pack a bag for an overnight stay at a relatives house, then the Teletubbies do a suitcase dance.
392	27	"Number Four"	2 February 2016
The Teletubbies count to four – four Teletubbies, four flowers, four pieces of Tubbytoast. In "Tummy Tales" two sisters help their dad to put a number four on their front door.
393	28	"Flying"	3 February 2016
The Teletubbies pretend to fly. Po goes so fast on her scooter that it begins to fly over Teletubbyland. In "Tummy Tales" a group of children watch swans flying.
394	29	"Taps"	4 February 2016
Tinky Winky's bag fills up with sparkles from a tap and when the house overflows with custard, Po has to turn the tubby custard machine off. A child in "Tummy Tales" uses a new tap in the bathroom when brushing her teeth before bedtime.
395	30	"Party!"	5 February 2016
It's party time! The Teletubbies have lots of balloons, party blowers and sparkles. They visit the Tiddlytubbies and do a fun party dance. In "Tummy Tales" twins celebrate their birthday with friends.
396	31	"Custard Chaos"	9 May 2016
The Tubbycustard machine careers out of home dome and takes a messy ride around Teletubbyland with Tinky Winky, Dipsy, Laa-Laa and Po on board.
397	32	"Tallest Shortest"	10 May 2016
The Teletubbies stand up to see who is the tallest and who is the shortest. Tinky Winky and Po play with the Tiddlytubbies and the children in "Tummy Tales" put themselves into height order ready for a photograph.
398	33	"Rolling"	11 May 2016
Laa-Laa and Po have fun, first rolling down a hill and then rolling each other! The Teletubbies enjoy watching children in "Tummy Tales" rolling down a slope.
399	34	"Conga"	12 May 2016
The Teletubbies do a conga dance and then conga into home dome to answer the Tubby Phone. In "Tummy Tales" the children have lots of fun as they conga around the soft play center.
400	35	"Waving"	13 May 2016
The Teletubbies decide to play a waving game and then they have fun watching the children in "Tummy Tales" waving as they set off on a boat. Finally the Teletubbies wave to the Tiddlytubbies who are off to sleepybyes.
401	36	"Catch the Ball"	16 May 2016
Po and Laa-Laa play catch with a ball. In "Tummy Tales", two brothers learn to catch a ball and play catch with their dog.
402	37	"Loop the Loop"	17 May 2016
In "Tummy Tales", a group of children watch a plane loop the loop in the air. The Teletubbies have magical fun watching a shooting star loop the loop and the Tubbytoast goes loop the loop as it flies out of the Tubby Toaster.
403	38	"Follow the Leader"	18 May 2016
The Teletubbies play choo-choo and follow the Tubbycustard machine. The children in "Tummy Tales" follow their nursery teacher to the local playground.
404	39	"Purple"	19 May 2016
In "Tummy Tales", a young boy learns to knit with purple wool and in Teletubbyland, Tinky Winky answers the Tubby Phone. Then it's time for the Tiddlytubbies to go sleepybyes.
405	40	"Ballet"	20 May 2016
Dipsy ballet twirls with the Tiddlytubbies and in "Tummy Tales", a group of children put on ballet performances for their families.
406	41	"Taking a Ride"	23 May 2016
The Teletubbies ride the Dup Dup and the Tubby Custard Machine. In "Tummy Tales", a boy takes a ride on a cable car.
407	42	"Photos"	24 May 2016
The Teletubbies take selfies with the Tubby Phone and a child in "Tummy Tales" has their photo taken in a photo booth with their grandparent.
408	43	"Knock Knock"	25 May 2016
Tinky Winky knocks on a door and is welcomed by Dipsy, Laa-Laa and Po. The children in "Tummy Tales" knock on their neighbours' doors.
409	44	"Things"	26 May 2016
The Teletubbies find different uses for their favourite things and a child in "Tummy Tales" makes a seaside picture out of lots of things.
410	45	"Breakfast"	27 May 2016
The Teletubbies wake up and can't decide whether to have tubby custard or tubby toast, so they have both!
411	46	"Keep Fit"	17 October 2016
The Teletubbies feel tired after doing lots of keep-fit exercises but they are ready for action again after eating lots of Tubby Custard. In Tummy Tales, a child, her mum and their dog keep fit on a beach.
412	47	"Party Invitation"	18 October 2016
In Tummy Tales, a child makes party invitations and in Teletubbyland a magical party invitation arrives. It's an invitation for the Teletubbies to attend the Tiddlytubbies' party.
413	48	"Taking Turns"	19 October 2016
Laa-Laa and Po take turns to ride Po's scooter and then they take turns to play with the Tiddlytubbies. Children in Tummy Tales take turns to press apples into juice.
414	49	"Horses"	20 October 2016
When a Voice Trumpet rises and makes sounds like a horse, Tinky Winky, Dipsy and Laa-Laa trot and gallop across Teletubbyland pretending to be horses. Children in Tummy Tales help to groom and feed a horse.
415	50	"Running Race"	21 October 2016
The Teletubbies do running races and they each have a chance to win. When the Tubby Phone rings, there's a race to reach it before the Tubby Phone Dance. In Tummy Tales, two sisters watch their dad running in a race.
416	51	"Fixing Things"	24 October 2016
When the Noo-noo fixes the broken Tubby Custard Machine, the Teletubbies go on a Tubby Custard Ride and make a lovely custardy mess inside and outside Home Dome. In Tummy Tales, a boy helps his mum fix a hole in his space hopper.
417	52	"Being Quiet"	25 October 2016
Tinky Winky can't sleep and goes outside to play so as not to wake the other Teletubbies. But Tinky Winky's noisy footsteps, on top of Home Dome, wakes them up! In Tummy Tales, children quietly feed some birds and the Teletubbies are quiet as they watch the Tiddlytubbies go to Sleepybyes.
418	53	"Music"	26 October 2016
The Teletubbies become a pop group and perform a pop song. In Tummy Tales, children watch a one man band playing music and accompany him by playing their own music.
419	54	"Making Sounds"	27 October 2016
Po makes lots of silly, funny sounds with the levers and buttons in Home Dome and then the Tubby Phone rings for a silly Tubby Phone Dance. The Teletubbies enjoy watching children visit a farm and copying the sounds they hear.
420	55	"Rainbow"	28 October 2016
The Teletubbies go for a walk on a lovely sunny day, but then clouds appear and it starts to rain. A rainbow shines in the sky and a rainbow path gives the Teletubbies a magical trail to follow. In Tummy Tales, children make a huge rainbow print with their feet.
421	56	"Twinkle Twinkle"	31 October 2016
It is night time in Teletubbyland and the Teletubbies are all sleeping, apart from Tinky Winky. Stepping outside, Tinky Winky sees a star in the sky which sings Twinkle Twinkle. The other Teletubbies are woken so they can enjoy the special twinkly star. In Tummy Tales, a girl looks up to the night sky to spot the twinkliest star.
422	57	"Football"	1 November 2016
Tinky Winky, Dipsy, Laa-Laa and Po play football. The Teletubbies' ball goes inside Home Dome, just as the Tubby Phone begins to ring. It is time for a Tubby Phone Dance! The children in Tummy Tales enjoy a football lesson.
423	58	"Again Again"	2 November 2016
The Teletubbies can't get enough of the Tubby Custard Ride so they ask to go on it again and again! In Tummy Tales, children play on a slide again and again.
424	59	"Tall Tower"	3 November 2016
Laa-Laa has fun watching Dipsy stretch up, like a very tall tower. The Tubby Toaster goes crazy and fires out lots of Tubby Toast which ends up in a tall tower too. The Teletubbies watch children climb the stairs to the top of a tall tower in Tummy Tales.
425	60	"Inside Outside"	4 November 2016
The Teletubbies have lots of fun playing inside and outside Home Dome. They wave to the Tiddlytubbies from inside and outside too. In Tummy Tales, a girl helps her dad take wet washing from inside to hang up outside to dry.

=== Season 3 (2017) ===
No. overall	No. in series	Title	Original release date
426	61	"Close the Gate"	13 March 2017
The Teletubbies accidentally leave the Tiddlytubbies' Gate Open, and some of them escape into Home Dome! They must find them all and then close the gate. In Tummy Tales, a boy is helped to close the gate after sheep.
427	62	"Trailer"	14 March 2017
When it's time for the Tubby Custard Ride, there's a special trailer the Teletubbies haven't seen before. It's for the Noo-Noo who gets to go on a special Tubby Custard Ride. In Tummy Tales, two children have a ride on a pedal bike trailer to a playground.
428	63	"Say Hello"	15 March 2017
Tinky Winky and Laa-Laa are in Home Dome when they Tubby Phone rings. It's Dipsy and Po calling from the Tubby Mobile to say Hello. In Tummy Tales, some children speak to their distant grandfather via Skype on a tablet.
429	64	"Picnic"	16 March 2017
The Teletubbies go on a very special picnic together. Lots of Tubby Toast pops out of the Dup Dup and lands on the picnic plates for them to munch.
430	65	"Honk Honk"	17 March 2017
The Teletubbies hear a 'honk' noise in the distance and the Tubby Car approaches. It drives them across Teletubbyland as they sing the Tubby Car Song.
431	66	"Not Enough Room"	20 March 2017
The Teletubbies are about to go on the Tubby Custard Ride with the hat, bag, ball and scooter when they realise there is not enough room. the Noo-Noo looks after their favorite things. In Tummy Tales, there is not enough room for some people to get on a boat to cross the river so they have to wait for the second time that the boat comes back.
432	67	"Tickly"	21 March 2017
The Teletubbies enjoy doing Round and Round the Garden, especially the end of the rhyme where they all tickle each other. The Tiddlytubbies have tickly fun too.
433	68	"Spinning"	22 March 2017
The Teletubbies are spinning on their chairs until the Magic Windmill spins. In Tummy Tales, they watch children playing with spinning tops. Then they travel by Tubby Car to the Hidey Hup where they all spin around on the Tubby Spinny.
434	69	"Toast"	23 March 2017
The Teletubbies eat lots of Tubby Toast and make a huge pile of crumbs. Luckily, the Noo-Noo is on hand to clean up. In Tummy Tales, a boy is helped by his father to make toast. Later on, they have more toast but there's only one piece left so it spins off the table into the Tiddleyubbies' play area and then to the Noo-Noo which sucks it up.
435	70	"Bouncing"	24 March 2017
The Teletubbies bounce inside before the Magic Windmill spins and in Tummy Tales, children bounce on trampolines at a trampoline park. Laa-Laa and Po drive the Tubby Car to the Hidey Hup and take turns on the Tubby Bouncy. Tinky Winky and Dipsy arrive and they have a go at bouncing too.
436	71	"Didgeridoo"	27 March 2017
Tinky Winky learns to play the Didgeridoo. In Tummy Tales, children make and play with didgeridoos. The Teletubbies so a special didgeridoo Tubby Phone Dance. Tiddlytubby Ping loves the didgeridoo too.
437	72	"Teddy Bear"	28 March 2017
Po finds a teddy bear in Teletubbyland. She and the rest of the Teletubbies show it to the Tiddlytubbies and they all love it very much. In Tummy Tales, a child takes her nursery's teddy bear on a mountain train to get to the ski slopes.
438	73	"Greens"	29 March 2017
Tinky Winky, Laa-Laa and Po pick delicious green beans. The Noo-Noo puts the beans into the Tubby Custard Machine and out comes tasty, green Tubby Custard. In Tummy Tales, a child picks their own greens and eats them with their parents.
439	74	"Blow"	30 March 2017
It's a windy day and the Teletubbies collect lots of leaves that have blown off the trees. the leaves go everywhere in Home Dome so the Noo-Noo cleans up.
440	75	"Sliding Down"	31 March 2017
The Tubby Car takes the Teletubbies to the Hidey Hup where they discover the Tubby Slidey. they have great fun sliding down again and again.
441	76	"Backwards and Forwards"	15 May 2017
The Teletubbies have fun moving backwards and forwards. The Tubby Custard Ride goes forwards and backwards as well. In Tummy Tales, children go backwards and forwards on zipwires.
442	77	"Sleepybyes"	16 May 2017
It is sleepybyes time so the Teletubbies say goodnight to the Tiddlytubbies. But Po isn't tired and goes for a special ride on her scooter. In Tummy Tales, some children get help to put some chickens to bed.
443	78	"Up Down, Down Up"	17 May 2017
The Teletubbies drive the Tubby Car to the Hidey Hup where they discover the Tubby Uppy Downy. they have fun going up and down on it. In Tummy Tales, a child goes for a helicopter ride that goes up and down at a theme park.
444	79	"Yellow"	18 May 2017
It's a special day for Laa-Laa big yellow flowers grow in Teletubbyland and a yellow balloon leads to her Tiddlytubby Umby Pumby. in Tummy Tales, a child looks at some daffodils.
445	80	"Fast Slow, Slow Fast"	19 May 2017
The Teletubbies take turns to go up and down on the Dup Dup. Sometimes they go fast and sometimes they go slow and even the Noo-Noo has a go. In Tummy Tales, some girls go fast and slow on a micro scooter.
446	81	"Give it Back"	22 May 2017
Tinky Winky and Dipsy both want a go with Tinky Winky's Bag and start to squabble. The Noo-Noo sucks it up and only gives it back when they are ready to share. In Tummy Tales, children have books to the librarian on the library bus.
447	82	"Stuck"	23 May 2017
All the Teletubbies are stuck. Tinky Winky's hand is stuck in his bag, Dipsy's hat is stuck, Laa-Laa's ball is stuck and Po is stuck on the Tubby Slidey. in Tummy Tales, a child plays with a funny mixture and gets her hands stuck.
448	83	"What's Your Name?"	24 May 2017
The Teletubbies enjoy a game of What's Your Name! The Tiddlytubbies join in the game too. Later' there's a surprise when a bowl of Tubby Custard joins in with the game. In Tummy Tales, children have a music party where people's names are sung.
449	84	"Musical Statues"	25 May 2017
The Teletubbies enjoy a game of musical statues. It takes them a few turns to work out that when the music stops they must stand very still.
450	85	"I Spy"	26 May 2017
One of the voice trumpets leads a game of I Spy where the Teletubbies have to spot different colours-purple, green, yellow and red. What or who can they spot with those colours? Then after the game it's the Tiddlytubbies song.
451	86	"This Way That Way"	26 June 2017
The Teletubbies go left and right on a Tubby Car journey to the Hidey Hup. The Tubby Spinny goes left and right as well. In Tummy Tales, some children go through a maze to get to the middle of it.
452	87	"Lullaby"	27 June 2017
During the Tiddlytubbies' Sleepybyes, RuRu is wide awake. The Teletubbies take turns to sing him a lullaby. When they sing it together, it sends RuRu to sleep. In Tummy Tales, a baby is sung a lullaby by their mum.
453	88	"Listen"	28 June 2017
The Teletubbies take turns to listen to music through a pair of headphones. They love dancing to the music they hear. In Tummy Tales, a child is at a special Doctor's for a hearing test.
454	89	"Swap Places!"	29 June 2017
The Teletubbies swap places in the Tubby Car and drive to the Hidey Hup. They swap again on the Tubby Uppy Downy before going up and down.
455	90	"Noise"	30 June 2017
The Teletubbies are trying very hard not to make any noise. Even the Tiddlytubbies try to be quiet as well. Then they make as much noise as possible during the Tubby Phone Dance.
456	91	"Footprints"	9 October 2017
Tinky Winky, Dipsy and Laa-Laa follow a trail of muddy footprints and find Po in bed with veruy muddy feet. The Noo-Noo cleans off the mud. In Tummy Tales, children walk on sand at a beach and leave footprints behind. Meanwhile in Teletubbyland, they follow two sets of muddy foorprints and get very messy during the Tubby Custard Ride.
457	92	"Feeling Better"	10 October 2017
It's time to wake up but Tinky Winky isn't feeling well soon after some rest he feels better but the other Teletubbies don't feel well. In Tummy Tales, a vet looks at a lady dog with a skin problem. Back in Teletubbyland, Tinky Winky comes up on the Dup Dup and runs around Teletubbyland. then all the Teletubbies soon feel better and they do a stamping dance.
458	93	"Cold"	11 October 2017
The Teletubbies are outside in the cold when they spot the Tiddlytubbies, who are inside and warm. They put on hats, mittens and scarves to keep warm.
459	94	"Day Trip"	12 October 2017
The Teletubbies go on a day trip to the Hidey Hup. They take turns on the Tubby Bouncy, the Tubby Slidey and the Tubby Spinny before they go on the Tubby Uppy Downy together. In Tummy Tales, children go on a day trip to the dokey sanctuary.
460	95	"Tiddlytubby Party"	13 October 2017
In Tummy Tales, a baby celebrates their first birthday. Tinky Winky finds a party invitation and shows it to the other Teletubbies, the invention takes flight and follow it to find a Tiddlytubbies Party. Later they do the Tubby Phone Dance.
461	96	"Take Off"	16 October 2017
Po collects lots of balloons and takes off into the air! Floating high above Teletubbyland, Po waves to the other Teletubbies below. When the Balloons pop she Lands.
462	97	"Treasure Trail"	17 October 2017
The Teletubbies follow a trail of flowers that leads them to some very special treasure.
463	98	"Up High"	18 October 2017
The Teletubbies bounce on the Tubby Bouncy. Po bounces high as a cloud, then Laa-Laa bounces higher, Dipsy bounces even higher and Tinky Winky bounces highest of all. In Tummy Tales, a child goes on the London Eye.
464	99	"Running Around in Circles"	19 October 2017
The Teletubbies run around in circles in Home Dome. The Noo-Noo joins in as well and they have fun chasing. In Tummy Tales, children run around in circles and play 'Duck Duck Goose'.
465	100	"Lights Out"	20 October 2017
When the lights go out in Home Dome, the Teletubbies get the giggles! the lights come back on again and there's Tubby Custard mess everywhere. In Tummy Tales, children walk through special lights in a room that turns on and off.

=== Season 4 (2018) ===
No. overall	No. in series	Title	Original release date
466	101	"Bottom Bump"	4 May 2018
The Teletubbies bounce on the Tubby Bouncy before wiggling their bottoms to a special bottom-bump song.
467	102	"Washing"	5 May 2018
Po eats Tubby Custard and gets a messy bib. She washes it and hangs it up to dry before eating more Tubby Custard with the other Teletubbies.
468	103	"Flamenco"	6 May 2018
The Teletubbies are flamenco dancing! They are surprisingly good.
469	104	"Join In"	7 May 2018
The Teletubbies have their favorite things and the Noo-Noo wants to join in. When the Tubby Phone rings, they do the Tubby Phone Dance together.
470	105	"Songtime"	8 May 2018
The Teletubbies enjoy Tiddlytubbies Songtime. Then it is time for Teletubbies Songtime. they sing solo before singing all together.
471	106	"Three"	11 May 2018
Laa-Laa has fun counting to three with rabbits, flowers and trees! she even counts her Three friends.
472	107	"Straws"	12 May 2018
Big straws appear in Teletubbyland and the Teletubbies wonder what to do with them. They blow through the straws making colourful bubbles.
473	108	"Bunny Rabbits"	13 May 2018
The Teletubbies watch the rabbits before Bunny ears and tails appear on them. they do the bunny hop before saying 'eh oh' to the Tiddlytubbies.
474	109	"Together"	14 May 2018
Dipsy and Laa-Laa drive to the Hidey Hup in the Tubby Car. They meet Tinky Winky and Po, and they all go on the Tubby Uppy Downy together.
475	110	"Rain"	15 May 2018
A Cloud appears and it begins to rain on Teletubbyland. The Teletubbies watch the flowers bloom. Another cloud appears and it rains Tubby Custard!.
476	111	"Mixed Up"	1 October 2018
The Teletubbies have their favourite things all magically swap places and become mixed up.
477	112	"Dizzy"	2 October 2018
The Teletubbies drive to the Hidey Hup in the Tibby Car. They have fun getting dizzy on the Tubby Spinny.
478	113	"King"	3 October 2018
In Teletubbyland Dipsy becomes a King and Tinky Winky becomes his servant delivering Tubby Custard and Tubby Toast to him whatever he wants.
479	114	"Crazy Golf"	4 October 2018
After Tinky Winky finds a Golf Ball he and Laa-Laa play a game of Crazy Golf.
480	115	"Where? There!"	5 October 2018
Laa-Laa and Po play a game of hide and seek. They both take turns at hiding then Tinky Winky and Dipsy are also hiding and find the girls together.
481	116	"Circus"	8 October 2018
It's Circus time at Teletubbyland! Tinky Winky balances on the Tightrope, Dipsy does some Juggling, Laa-Laa flies on the Trapeze and Po is a funny Clown.
482	117	"Stairs"	9 October 2018
A musical staircase magically appears in Teletubbyland. The Teletubbies take turns making music as they go up and down the stairs.
483	118	"Go Outside"	10 October 2018
The Teletubbies want to go outside but it's raining in Teletubbyland. Some wellies and umbrellas magically appear and they go outside for some rainy day fun.
484	119	"Hidey Hup"	11 October 2018
The Teletubbies drive to the Hidey Hup in the Tubby Car. They enjoy going on the Tubby Bouncy, the Tubby Uppy Downy, the Tubby Spinny and the Tubby Slidey.
485	120	"Tiddly Phone"	12 October 2018
The Teletubbies receive a call on the Tubby Phone. It's the Tiddlytubbies ringing to say hello just before the Tubby Phone Dance.

== Home media ==
=== VHS ===
- Here Come the Teletubbies (Release Date: 1997 (UK); Release Date: 1 September 1998 (US))
- Dance with the Teletubbies (Release Date: 1997 (UK); Release Date: 1 September 1998 (US))
- Nursery Rhymes (Release Date: 1998 (UK); Release Date: 9 February 1999 (US))
- Favourite Things/Favorite Things (Release Date: 1998 (UK); Release Date: 11 May 1999 (US))
- Uh Oh! Messes & Muddles/Funny Day (USA) (Release Date: 1998 (UK); Release Date: 7 September 1999 (US))
- Happy Christmas from the Teletubbies (1998)
- Big Hug! (Release Date: 1999 (UK); Release Date: 1 February 2000 (US))
- Musical Playtime (1999)
- Teletubbies and the Snow (1999)
- Ready Steady Go! (2000)
- Bedtime/Bedtime Stories and Lullabies (2000)
- Hands, Feet and Dirty Knees (2000)
- Animals Big and Small/Baby Animals (2001)
- Busy Day (2001)
- Go! & Let's Dance! (2001)
- Magical Surprises (2001)
- Happy Weather Stories (2002)
- Hide and Seek (2002)
- What's That? (2002)
- Look! (2003)
- Oooh! (2003)
- Again-Again! (2004)
- Naughty Noo-Noo! (2004)

=== Digital ===
- The first ten original episodes from 1997 and the first sixty episodes of the new series have been release on BBC Store.
- In the US, the first 208 episodes of the 1997–2001 series are available on the NOGGIN video service. The first 52 were released on 25 May 2016, the next 52 were released on 4 January 2017, the third 52 were released on 3 May 2017, the fourth 26 were released on 13 September 2017 and the fifth 26 were released on 24 January 2018 with the remaining 157 episodes rolling out in the future.
