= Matthew 7:3 =

- ← 7:2 7:4 →
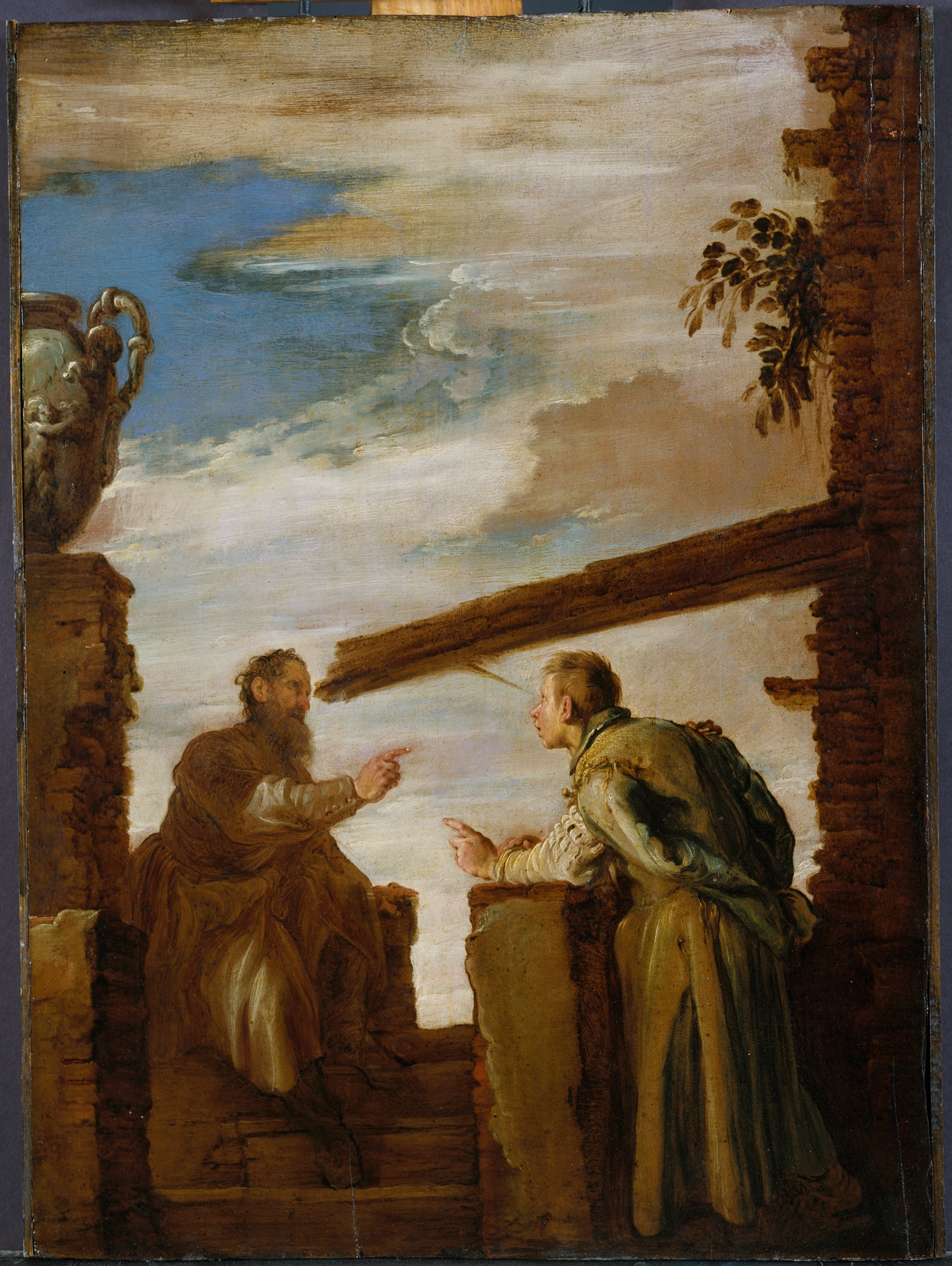
- A c. 1619 painting by Domenico Fetti entitled The Parable of the Mote and the Beam.
- Book: Gospel of Matthew
- Christian Bible part: New Testament

Matthew 7:3 is the third verse of the seventh chapter of the Gospel of Matthew in the New Testament and is part of the Sermon on the Mount. This verse continues Jesus' warnings addressed to those who judge others.

== Content ==
In the King James Version of the Bible the text reads:

And why beholdest thou the mote that is in thy brother's eye, but considerest not the beam that is in thine own eye?

The World English Bible translates the passage as:

Why do you see the speck that is in your brother's eye, but don't consider the beam that is in your own eye?

The Novum Testamentum Graece text is:

τί δὲ βλέπεις τὸ κάρφος τὸ ἐν τῷ ὀφθαλμῷ τοῦ ἀδελφοῦ σου, τὴν δὲ ἐν τῷ σῷ ὀφθαλμῷ δοκὸν οὐ κατανοεῖς; (Note: For a collection of other versions see Bible Hub Matthew 7:3.)

== Analysis ==
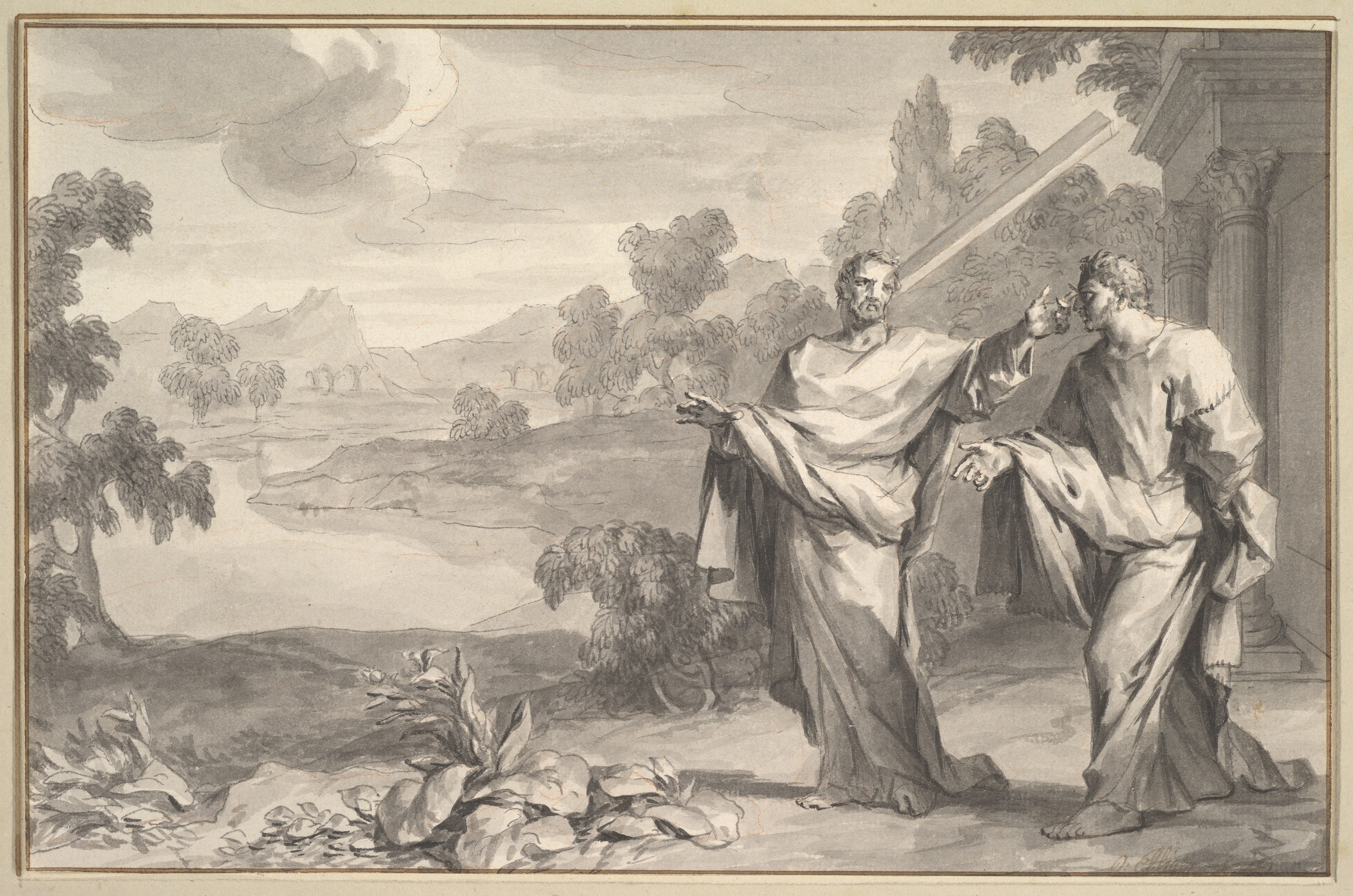
The Parable of the Mote and the Beam. Drawing by Ottmar Elliger the Younger (1666–1735).

This verse warns the hypocrites (see verse 5) who attack others for their small flaws while ignoring their own massive ones, those who judge others but do not evaluate themselves. It has a dual meaning, first attacking the hypocrisy of those who criticize others while ignoring their own much larger flaws, and since the flaw is in the eye it is a metaphor for how such flaws can blind one. R. T. France comments that it is not wrong to try to help other people's failing (cf. Matthew 18:15–17), but the person unaware of their own greater failing is not in position to do it.

The metaphor is a rather extreme one. The word translated as mote or speck can refer to a tiny splinter or piece of sawdust, or colloquially to any minute object. The word translated as beam refers to a rafter or a log such as would hold up the roof of a house. A beam is a difficult thing to get in one's eye, but it functions as a humorous and hyperbolic metaphor for an extreme flaw. The metaphor comes from woodworking and carpenter workshop. It is often seen as rooted in Jesus' traditional employment as a carpenter.

== Commentary from the Church Fathers ==
=== Augustine ===
- The Lord having admonished us concerning hasty and unjust judgment; and because that they are most given to rash judgment, who judge concerning things uncertain; and they most readily find fault, who love rather to speak evil and to condemn than to cure and to correct; a fault that springs either from pride or jealousy: therefore He subjoins, Why seest thou the mote in thy brother's eye, and seest not the beam in thy own eye?
- As if he perhaps have sinned in anger, and you correct him with settled hate. For as great as is the difference between a beam and a mote, so great is the difference between anger and hatred. For hatred is anger become inveterate. It may be if you are angry with a man that you would have him amend, not so if you hate him.
- When then we are brought under the necessity of finding fault with any, let us first consider whether the sin be such as we have never had; secondly that we are yet men, and may fall into it; then, whether it be one that we have had, and are now without, and then let our common frailty come into our mind, that pity and not hate may go before correction. Should we find ourselves in the same fault, let us not reprove, but groan with the offender, and invite him to struggle with us. Seldom indeed and in cases of great necessity is reproof to be employed; and then only that the Lord may be served and not ourselves.

=== Others ===
Chrysostom: Many do this, if they see a Monk having a superfluous garment, or a plentiful meal, they break out into bitter accusation, though themselves daily seize and devour, and suffer from excess of drinking.

Pseudo-Chrysostom: Otherwise; This is spoken to the doctors. For every sin is either a great or a small sin according to the character of the sinner. If he is a laie, it is small and a mote in comparison of the sin of a priest, which is the beam.

Hilary of Poitiers: Otherwise; The sin against the Holy Spirit is to take from God power which has influences, and from Christ substance which is of eternity, through whom as God came to man, so shall man likewise come to God. As much greater then as is the beam than the mote, so much greater is the sin against the Holy Spirit than all other sins. As when unbelievers object to others carnal sins, and secrete in themselves the burden of that sin, to wit, that they trust not the promises of God, their minds being blinded as their eye might be by a beam.

Jerome: He speaks of such as though themselves guilty of mortal sin, do not forgive a trivial fault in their brother.

Pseudo-Chrysostom: That is, with what face can you charge your brother with sin, when yourself are living in the same or a yet greater sin?

== General sources ==
- Fowler, Harold. The Gospel of Matthew: Volume One. Joplin: College Press, 1968.
- Schweizer, Eduard. The Good News According to Matthew. Atlanta: John Knox Press, 1975.

Preceded by Matthew 7:2	Gospel of Matthew; Chapter 7	Succeeded by Matthew 7:4
