= Judgement =

Evaluation of circumstances to make a decision

Illustration of a judge evaluating evidence in court to make a judgement

Judgement (or judgment) is the evaluation of given circumstances to make a decision or form an opinion. It may also refer to the result of such an evaluation, or to the ability of someone to make good judgements.

In an informal context, a judgement may refer to an opinion expressed as fact. In logic, judgements assert the truth of statements. In the context of a legal trial, a judgment is a final finding, statement or ruling, based on evidence, rules and precedents (see Judgment (law)). In the context of psychology, judgement informally refers to the quality of a person's cognitive faculties and adjudicational capabilities, typically called 'wisdom'. In formal psychology, judgement and decision making (JDM) is a cognitive process by which individuals reason, make decisions, and form opinions and beliefs.

== Judgements in law ==
In law, a judgment is a decision of a court regarding the rights and liabilities of parties in a legal action or proceeding. Judgments also generally provide the court's explanation of why it has chosen to make a particular court order.

Speakers of British English tend to use the term at the appellate level as synonymous with judicial opinion. American English speakers prefer to maintain a clear distinction between the opinion of an appellate court (setting forth reasons for the disposition of an appeal) and the judgment of an appellate court (the pronouncement of the disposition itself).

In Canadian English, the phrase "reasons for judgment" is often used interchangeably with "judgment," although the former refers to the court's justification of its judgment while the latter refers to the final court order regarding the rights and liabilities of the parties.

=== Etymology and origin ===
The scales of justice, a common symbol of legal judgment held by Lady Justice

The term "judgment" derives from Latin iudicare ("to judge"), entering English via the Old French term jugement around the 13th century. It initially defined both legal trials and eschatological concepts like Judgment Day. In English law, judgments began as medieval writs that evolved to court decisions, which was interspersed with gradual inventions like summary judgment, which originated in 19th-century equity courts to resolve undisputed debt claims efficiently. These were later codified in systems like the U.S. Federal Rules of Civil Procedure (1938). This mechanism allows the dismissal of meritless claims.

== Judgement in cognitive science and psychology ==
=== Judgement in psychology ===
In cognitive psychology (and related fields like experimental philosophy, social psychology, behavioral economics, or experimental economics), judgement is part of a set of cognitive processes by which individuals reason, make decisions, and form beliefs and opinions (collectively, judgement and decision making, abbreviated JDM). This involves evaluating information, weighing evidence, making choices, and coming to conclusions. Judgements are often influenced by cognitive biases, heuristics, prior experience, social context, abilities (e.g., numeracy, probabilistic thinking), and psychological traits (e.g., tendency toward analytical reasoning). In research, the Society for Judgment and Decision Making is an international academic society dedicated to the topic; they publish the peer-reviewed journal Judgment and Decision Making.

Research by Daniel Kahneman and Amos Tversky in the 1970s and 1980s identified psychological heuristics, such as the availability heuristic and anchoring, which often lead to predictable cognitive biases. Their theory formalized how people evaluate outcomes relative to a reference point, predicting loss aversion (valuing losses twice as much as equivalent gains). This has applications in behavioral economics and the design of policies. Kahneman's later works, including Thinking, Fast and Slow (2011), distinguish "System 1" (intuitive judgements) from "System 2" (deliberative judgements).

=== Judgement in neuroscience ===
Recent advances in cognitive neuroscience have mapped judgement processes to brain regions like the prefrontal cortex, often examining how intuitive decisions are processed, as shown in fMRI studies of risk assessment. In artificial intelligence, large language models (e.g., GPT-4) replicate human judgement biases such as loss aversion and the gambler's fallacy. This raises concerns for judicial prediction, though they improve accuracy in planned tasks.

== Judgement in ethics ==
Ethical judgement involves evaluating actions, intentions, or outcomes against moral norms, distinguishing it from prudential assessments. Philosophers debate whether such judgements are objective (grounded in reason) or subjective (relational), which has been the influence of theories such as deontology and virtue ethics.

=== Moral and conventional judgements ===
A major distinction, traced to Jean Piaget and refined by Elliot Turiel, separates moral judgements (concerning harm, fairness, rights; e.g., "stealing is wrong regardless of rules") from conventional judgements (rules, context-dependent; e.g., "uniforms are required in school"). This idea, supported by cultural developmental psychology, posits morals as universal, while conventions are arbitrary. This conception aids explanations for why children follow moral rules more rigidly.

In Kantian ethics, moral judgements derive from the categorical imperative, creating universalizable axioms via practical reason, distinct from hypothetical imperatives of skill or wisdom. Critics like Hegel viewed such judgements as historically mediated, evolving through the general ethical views of the population.

== Judgement in philosophy ==
=== Aristotle ===
==== Judging power or faculty ====
Aristotle observed that the ability to judge takes two forms: making assertions and thinking about definitions. He defined these powers in distinctive terms. Making an assertion as a result of judging can affirm or deny something; these are called positive and negative judgements, respectively, regardless of whether they are true or false. In a judgement, one affirms a given relationship between two things, or one denies a relationship between two things exists. The kinds of definitions that are judgements are those that are the intersection of two or more ideas rather than those indicated only by usual examples — that is, constitutive definitions.

Later Aristotelians, like Mortimer Adler, questioned whether "definitions of abstraction" that come from merging examples in one's mind are really analytically distinct from judgements.

==== Distinction of parts ====
In informal use, words like "judgement" are often used imprecisely. Aristotle observed that while propositions can be drawn from judgements and called "true" and "false", the objects that the terms try to represent are only "true" or "false"—with respect to the judging act or communicating that judgement—in the sense of "apt" or "inapt".

=== Kant ===
Immanuel Kant, in his Critique of Pure Reason (1781) and Critique of the Power of Judgment (1790), positioned judgement as the core of human cognition, defining it as a conscious mental operation that is the base of the conceptualization of objects via intuition. Kant's anti-psychologistic ideas emphasize judgement unifying cognitive capabilities for objective validity. "Determining" judgements subsume particulars under universals while "reflective" judgements seek universals for given particulars.

== Judgment in religion ==
=== Abrahamic religions ===
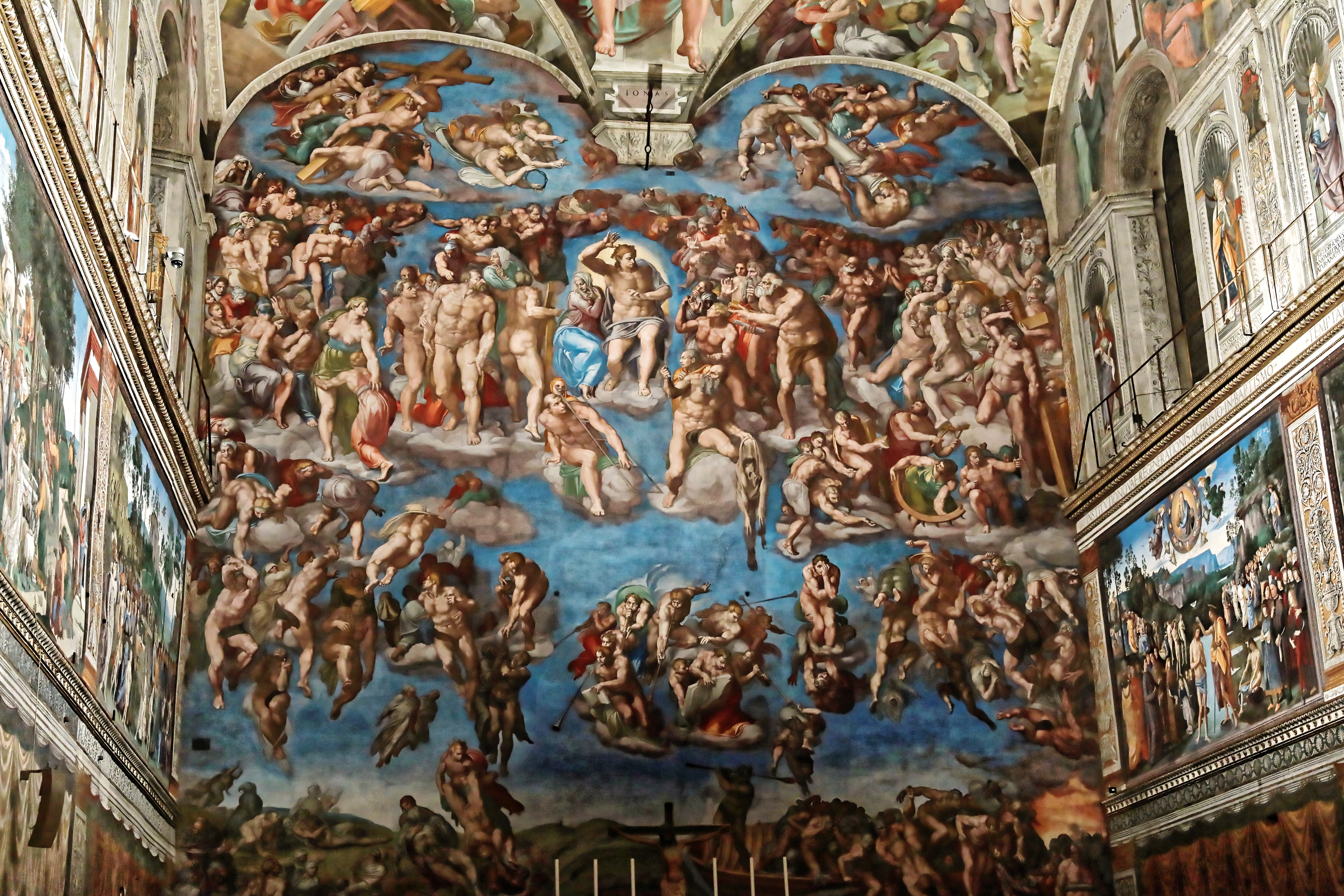
The Last Judgment by Michelangelo, an artistic depiction of divine discernment in Christianity

==== Christianity ====
In Christianity, the New Testament addresses interpersonal judgement in the Sermon on the Mount, where Jesus states: "Do not judge, or you too will be judged" (Matthew 7:1, NIV), cautioning against hypocritical condemnation.

==== Islam ====
In Islam, judgment manifests as Yawm al-Qiyamah (Day of Judgment), where Allah resurrects all souls for accountability based on deeds recorded in the Kitab (book of records), determining paradise or hell, showing mercy alongside justice (Quran 99:7–8).

=== Other religions ===
Hinduism views judgment as a function of karma, the law of cause and effect where actions (samskaras) influence rebirth (samsara) and ultimate liberation (moksha), with texts like the Bhagavad Gita portraying it as self-operated moral consequence, not divine intervention.

Similarly, Buddhism merges judgment via Right View (Pali: sammā diṭṭhi) in the Noble Eightfold Path, stressing the discernment of ethical actions as a means to break the cycle of rebirth and attain nirvana, as taught in the Dhammapada.

== See also ==
- Ad hominem – Attacking the person rather than their argument
- Bias – Inclination for or against
- Character assassination – Deliberate effort to damage an individual's reputation or credibility
- Choice – Deciding between multiple options
- Decree – Edict or proclamation usually issued by a head of state
- Defamation – Communication causing harm to reputation
- Discrimination – Prejudicial treatment based on membership in a certain group
- False accusation – Claim or allegation of wrongdoing that is untrue
- Gaslighting – Type of psychological manipulation
- General judgment – Christian theological concept
- Judgment at Nuremberg – 1961 film by Stanley Kramer
- Judge not lest ye be judged – Parable of Jesus in the Gospel of Matthew
- Phronesis – Ancient Greek word for a type of wisdom or intelligence
- Prejudice – Attitudes based on preconceived categories
- Presumption of guilt – Presumption that a person is guilty of a crime
- Social undermining – Type of anti-social behavior
- Smear campaign – Effort to damage someone's reputation
- Unconditional positive regard – Concept in psychotherapy
- Understanding – Ability to think about and use concepts to deal adequately with a subject
- Value judgment – Philosophical and ethical concept
