= Hogging =

Hogging can mean:

- Hogging (sexual practice)
- Hogging and sagging, the stress a ship is put under when it passes over the crest of a wave
- Hogging (UK English), the cutting off of a horse's mane, also called "roaching"

== See also ==
- Hog (disambiguation)
