= Swine (disambiguation) =

Swine most commonly refers to the domestic pig.

Swine may also refer to:

== Animal ==
- Domestic pigs; known to experts as the species Sus domesticus or the subspecies Sus scrofa domesticus
  - The wild boar, Sus scrofa, the species from which domestic swine were domesticated
    - Any species of the Genus Sus; see pig, including Sus scrofa and other species native to Southeast Asia and the Pacific
      - Any mammal of the subfamily Suinae, including Sus and closely related extinct genera
        - Any mammal in the Family Suidae, including the Suinae and other, mostly extinct subfamilies

== Place name ==
- Swine, East Riding of Yorkshire, a village and civil parish
- Swine railway station, on the Hull and Hornsea Railway
- Swine, German name of the river Świna flowing from the Oder Lagoon to the Baltic Sea

== Other ==
- Swine influenza, an infection caused by any one of several types of swine influenza viruses
- S.W.I.N.E., a real-time tactics game designed by FishTank Studio
- MV Swine, a coastal tanker involved in World War II
- "Swine" (Lady Gaga song), 2013
- "Swine" (Demi Lovato song), 2023
- "Swine", a 1994 song by Crunt
- Swine (film), a film by Robbie Lockie and Damien Clarkson
- Students Wildly Indignant about Nearly Everything!, Al Capp's satire in his cartoon Li'l Abner

== See also ==
- Pearls Before Swine (disambiguation)
- Pig (disambiguation)
- Hog (disambiguation)
- Boar (disambiguation)
