= Matthew 7:4 =

- ← 7:3 7:5 →
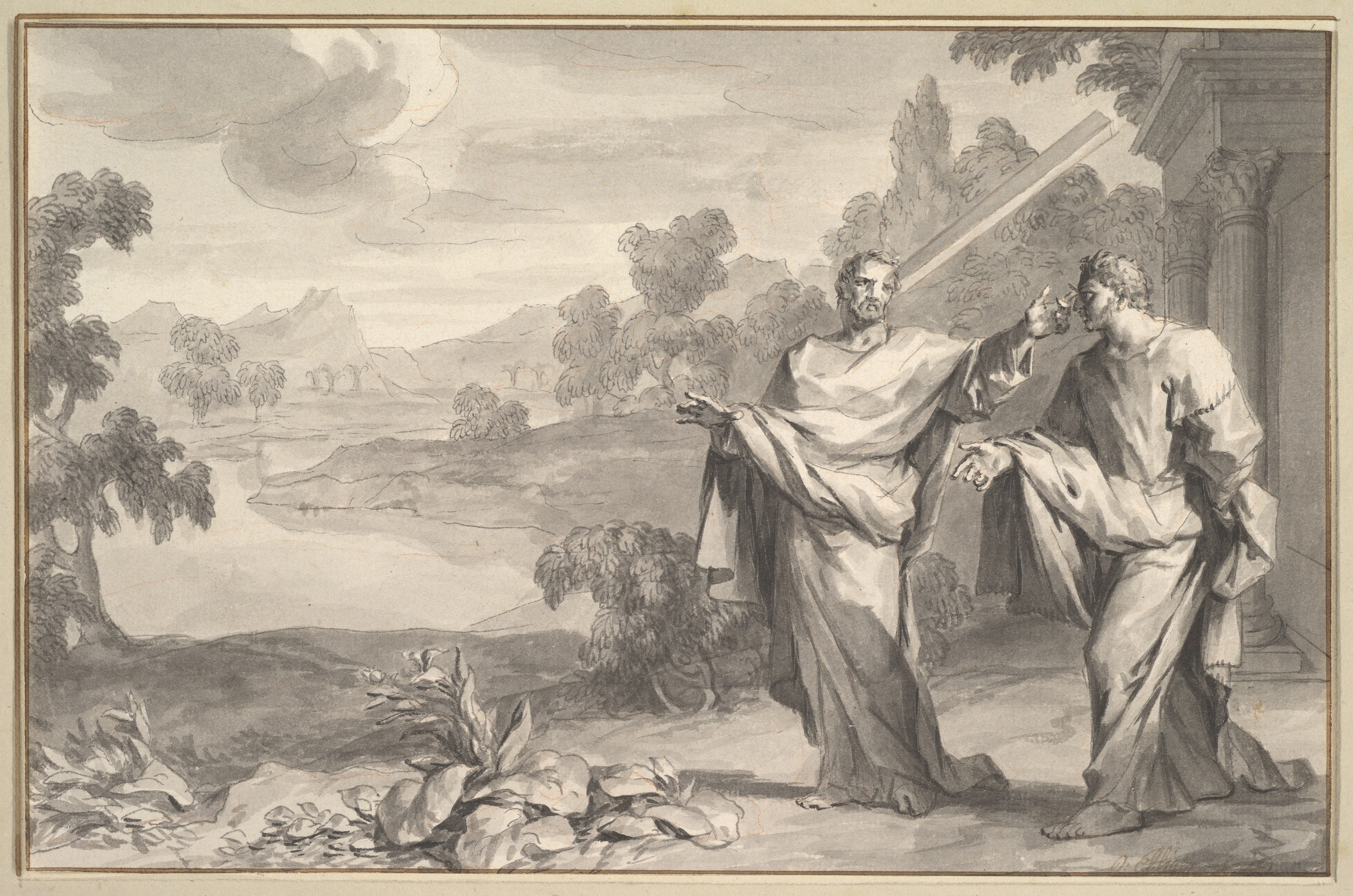
- The Parable of the Mote and the Beam. Drawing by Ottmar Elliger the Younger (1666–1735).
- Book: Gospel of Matthew
- Christian Bible part: New Testament

Matthew 7:4 is the fourth verse of the seventh chapter of the Gospel of Matthew in the New Testament and is part of the Sermon on the Mount. This verse continues the gospel's discussion of judgmentalism.

== Content ==
In the King James Version of the Bible the text reads:

Or how wilt thou say to thy brother, Let me pull out the
mote out of thine eye; and, behold, a beam is in thine own eye?

The World English Bible translates the passage as:

Or how will you tell your brother, ‘Let me remove the speck
from your eye;’ and behold, the beam is in your own eye?

The Novum Testamentum Graece text is:

ἢ πῶς ἐρεῖς τῷ ἀδελφῷ σου· Ἄφες ἐκβάλω τὸ κάρφος ἐκ τοῦ ὀφθαλμοῦ σου,
καὶ ἰδοὺ ἡ δοκὸς ἐν τῷ ὀφθαλμῷ σοῦ;

For a collection of other versions see BibleHub Matthew 7:4

== Analysis ==
The 'speck' or 'mote' is translated from the Greek κάρφος (karphos) that can also mean "any small dry body". The previous verse introduced the metaphor of a person with a plank in their own eye who criticizes someone for a speck in their eye. This verse extends the metaphor, showing how ridiculous a person with a plank would appear helping someone with simply a speck. Such aid is impossible, and its offer is ridiculous and condescending. Fowler sees this verse as stating that those with major flaws should keep quiet about the flaws of others until their own are dealt with. He links this to the metaphor of the blind leading the blind, if you follow one who cannot see you will simply follow the blind one into disaster.

== Commentary from the Church Fathers ==
Pseudo-Chrysostom: Otherwise; How sayest thou to thy brother; that is, with what purpose? From charity, that you may save your neighbour? Surely not, for you would first save yourself. You desire therefore not to heal others, but by good doctrine to cover bad life, and to gain praise of learning from men, not the reward of edifying from God, and you are a hypocrite; as it follows, Thou hypocrite, cast first the beam out of thine own eye.

Augustine: For to reprove sin is the duty of the good, which when the bad do, they act a part, dissembling their own character, and assuming one that does not belong to them.

Preceded by Matthew 7:3	Gospel of Matthew; Chapter 7	Succeeded by Matthew 7:5
