= Boar (disambiguation) =

Boar may refer to:

== Animals ==
- Wild boar
- Boar, adult male bear
- Boar, adult male domestic pig
- Boar, adult male of several other species; see List of animal names
- Iron Age pig, a pseudo-primitive breed of boar
- Razorback, hybrid boar in North America
- Boar, adult male guinea pig

== Art, entertainment, and media ==
- Boar (film), a 2016 Australian horror film
- The Boar (newspaper), the student newspaper of the University of Warwick, England
- The Boar (novel), a 1998 novel by Joe R. Lansdale
- Boar the Fighter, a fictional character in Brian Jacques' Redwall series

== Greek mythology ==
- Calydonian boar, hunted and killed by the heroes Atalanta and Meleager
- Erymanthian boar, captured by Hercules as one of his twelve labours

== Weapons ==
- BOAR, the Bombardment Aircraft Rocket, an American nuclear weapon of the 1950s
- Boar spear, a type of spear widely used in Germany and Scandinavia during the Roman era

== Other ==
- Boar, animal representation of Hai (亥) in the zodiac; see Pig (zodiac)
- Boars in heraldry

== See also ==
- British Otorhinolaryngology & Allied Sciences Research Society (BOARS)
- Boer
- Boor (disambiguation)
- Bore (disambiguation)
- Dzik (disambiguation)
- Hog (disambiguation)
- Pig (disambiguation)
- Swine (disambiguation)
