= Uncondemning Monk =

An Uncondemning Monk is recorded in the Prologue from Ohrid as having led a saintly life by never condemning another person in all his earthly days.

This monk, whose name is not recorded, is said to have been lazy and undisciplined in prayer as well as in all other aspects of his life. Therefore, the brethren were surprised at the monk's joy as he lay on his deathbed. The brother monks asked him the reason for his joy; to which he replied,

I have just seen the angels, and they showed me a page with all my many sins. I said to them: "The Lord said: 'Judge not, that ye be not judged.' I have never judged anyone and I hope in the mercy of God, that He will not judge me." And the angels tore up the sheet of paper.' Hearing this, the monks wondered at it and learned from it.

The Uncondemning Monk is commemorated on 30 March in the Eastern Orthodox Church and Byzantine Catholic Churches. (See St. John Climacus, who is also commemorated on 30 March.)

== See also ==
- Desert Fathers
- Eastern Christianity
- Christian monasticism
