= The Hogs =

The Hogs may refer to:

- The Arkansas Razorbacks, the mascot of the University of Arkansas in Fayetteville, Arkansas
- The Hogs (American football), the offensive line of the Washington Redskins of the National Football League during the 1980s and early 1990s

== See also ==
- Hog (disambiguation)
