= Multiplayer video game =

A multiplayer video game is a video game in which more than one person can play in the same game environment at the same time, either locally on the same computing system (couch co-op), on different computing systems via a local area network, or via a wide area network, most commonly the Internet. Multiplayer games usually require players to share a single game system or use networking technology to play together over a greater distance; players may compete against one or more human contestants, work cooperatively with a human partner to achieve a common goal, or supervise other players' activity. Due to multiplayer games allowing players to interact with other individuals, they provide an element of social communication absent from single-player games.

The history of multiplayer video games extends over several decades, tracing back to the emergence of electronic gaming in the mid-20th century. One of the earliest instances of multiplayer interaction was witnessed with the development of Spacewar! in 1962 for the DEC PDP-1 computer by Steve Russell and colleagues at the MIT. During the late 1970s and early 1980s, multiplayer gaming gained momentum within the arcade scene with classics like Pong and Tank. The transition to home gaming consoles in the 1980s further popularized multiplayer gaming. Titles like Super Mario Bros. for the NES and Golden Axe for the Sega Genesis introduced cooperative and competitive gameplay. Additionally, LAN gaming emerged in the late 1980s, enabling players to connect multiple computers for multiplayer gameplay, popularized by titles like Doom and Warcraft: Orcs & Humans. Players can also play together in the same room using splitscreen.

== Non-networked ==
Some of the earliest video games were two-player games, including early sports games (such as 1958's Tennis for Two and 1972's Pong), early shooter games such as Spacewar! (1962) and early racing video games such as Space Race (1973). The first examples of multiplayer real-time games were developed on the PLATO system about 1973. Multi-user games developed on this system included 1973's Empire and 1974's Spasim; the latter was an early first-person shooter. Other early video games included turn-based multiplayer modes, popular in tabletop arcade machines. In such games, play is alternated at some point (often after the loss of a life). All players' scores are often displayed onscreen so players can see their relative standing. Danielle Bunten Berry created some of the first multiplayer video games, such as her debut, Wheeler Dealers (1978) and her most notable work, M.U.L.E. (1983).

Gauntlet (1985) and Quartet (1986) introduced co-operative 4-player gaming to the arcades. The games had broader consoles to allow for four sets of controls.

=== Networked ===
Ken Wasserman and Tim Stryker identified three factors which make networked computer games appealing:

1. Multiple humans competing with each other instead of a computer
2. Incomplete information resulting in suspense and risk-taking
3. Real-time play requiring quick reaction

John G. Kemeny wrote in 1972 that software running on the Dartmouth Time-Sharing System (DTSS) had recently gained the ability to support multiple simultaneous users, and that games were the first use of the functionality. DTSS's popular American football game, he said, now supported head-to-head play by two humans.

The first large-scale serial sessions using a single computer were STAR (based on Star Trek), OCEAN (a battle using ships, submarines and helicopters, with players divided between two combating cities) and 1975's CAVE (based on Dungeons & Dragons), created by Christopher Caldwell (with artwork and suggestions by Roger Long and assembly coding by Robert Kenney) on the University of New Hampshire's DECsystem-1090. The university's computer system had hundreds of terminals, connected (via serial lines) through cluster PDP-11s for student, teacher, and staff access. The games had a program running on each terminal (for each player), sharing a segment of shared memory (known as the "high segment" in the OS TOPS-10). The games became popular, and the university often banned them because of their RAM use. STAR was based on 1974's single-user, turn-oriented BASIC program STAR, written by Michael O'Shaughnessy at UNH.

Wasserman and Stryker in 1980 described in BYTE how to network two Commodore PET computers with a cable. Their article includes a type-in, two-player Hangman, and describes the authors' more-sophisticated Flash Attack. SuperSet Software's Snipes (1981) uses networking technology that would become Novell NetWare. Digital Equipment Corporation distributed another multi-user version of Star Trek, Decwar, without real-time screen updating; it was widely distributed to universities with DECsystem-10s. In 1981 Cliff Zimmerman wrote an homage to Star Trek in MACRO-10 for DECsystem-10s and -20s using VT100-series graphics. "VTtrek" pitted four Federation players against four Klingons in a three-dimensional universe.

Flight Simulator II, released in 1986 for the Atari ST and Commodore Amiga, allowed two players to connect via modem or serial cable and fly together in a shared environment.

MIDI Maze, an early first-person shooter released in 1987 for the Atari ST, featured network multiplay through a MIDI interface before Ethernet and Internet play became common. It is considered the first multiplayer 3D shooter on a mainstream system, and the first network multiplayer action-game (with support for up to 16 players). There followed ports to a number of platforms (including Game Boy and Super NES) in 1991 under the title Faceball 2000, making it one of the first handheld, multi-platform first-person shooters and an early console example of the genre.

Networked multiplayer gaming modes are known as "netplay". The first popular video-game title with a Local Area Network(LAN) version, 1991's Spectre for the Apple Macintosh, featured AppleTalk support for up to eight players. Spectre's popularity was partially attributed to the display of a player's name above their cybertank. There followed 1993's Doom, whose first network version allowed four simultaneous players.

Play-by-email multiplayer games use email to communicate between computers. Other turn-based variations not requiring players to be online simultaneously are Play-by-post gaming and Play-by-Internet. Some online games are "massively multiplayer", with many players participating simultaneously. Two massively multiplayer genres are MMORPG (such as World of Warcraft or EverQuest) and MMORTS.

First-person shooters have become popular multiplayer games; Battlefield 1942 and Counter-Strike have little (or no) single-player gameplay. Developer and gaming site OMGPOP's library included multiplayer Flash games for the casual player until it was shut down in 2013. Some networked multiplayer games, including MUDs and massively multiplayer online games (MMOs) such as RuneScape, omit a single-player mode. The largest MMO in 2008 was World of Warcraft, with over 10 million registered players worldwide. World of Warcraft would hit its peak at 12 million players two years later in 2010, and in 2023 earned the Guinness World Record for best selling MMO video game. This category of games requires multiple machines to connect via the Internet; before the Internet became popular, MUDs were played on time-sharing computer systems and games like Doom were played on a LAN.

Beginning with the Sega NetLink in 1996, Game.com in 1997 and Dreamcast in 2000, game consoles support network gaming over LANs and the Internet. Many mobile phones and handheld consoles also offer wireless gaming with Bluetooth (or similar) technology. By the early 2010s online gaming had become a mainstay of console platforms such as Xbox and PlayStation. During the 2010s, as the number of Internet users increased, two new video game genres rapidly gained worldwide popularity – multiplayer online battle arena and battle royale game, both designed exclusively for multiplayer gameplay over the Internet.

Over time the number of people playing video games has increased. In 2020, the majority of households in the United States have an occupant that plays video games, and 65% of gamers play multiplayer games with others either online or in person.

== Local multiplayer ==
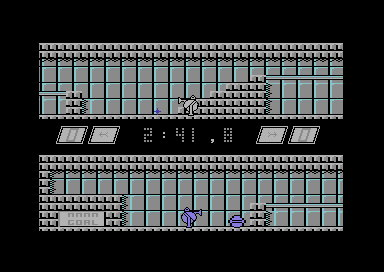
Split-screen multiplayer in Limes & Napoleon

For some games, "multiplayer" implies that players are playing on the same gaming system or network. This applies to all arcade games, but also to a number of console, and personal computer games too. Local multiplayer games played on a singular system sometimes use split screen, so each player has an individual view of the action (important in first-person shooters and in racing video games) Nearly all multiplayer modes on beat 'em up games have a single-system option, but racing games have started to abandon split-screen in favor of a multiple-system, multiplayer mode. Turn-based games such as chess also lend themselves to single system single screen and even to a single controller.

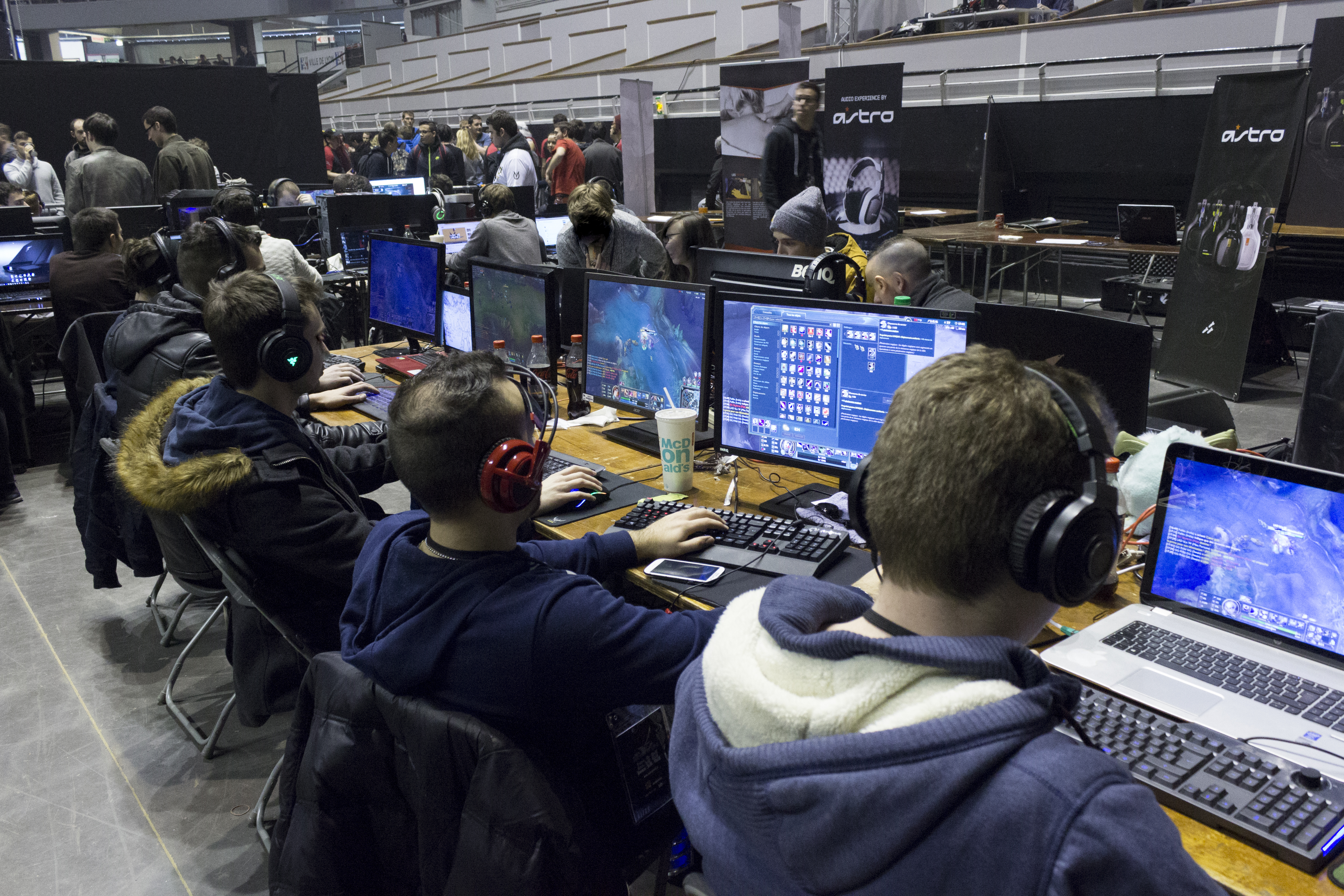
A LAN party

Multiple types of games allow players to use local multiplayer. The term "local co-op" or "couch co-op" refers to local multiplayer games played in a cooperative manner on the same system; these may use split-screen or some other display method. Another option is hot-seat games. Hot-seat games are typically turn-based games with only one controller or input set – such as a single keyboard/mouse on the system. Players rotate using the input device to perform their turn such that each is taking a turn on the "hot-seat".

Not all local multiplayer games are played on the same console or personal computer. Some local multiplayer games are played over a LAN. This involves multiple devices using one local network to play together. Networked multiplayer games on LAN eliminate common problems faced when playing online such as lag and anonymity. Games played on a LAN network are the focus of LAN parties. While local co-op and LAN parties still take place, there has been a decrease in both due to an increasing number of players and games utilizing online multiplayer gaming.

== Online multiplayer ==
Online multiplayer games connect players over a wide area network (a common example being the Internet). Unlike local multiplayer, players playing online multiplayer are not restricted to the same local network. This allows players to interact with others from a much greater distance.

Playing multiplayer online offers the benefits of distance, but it also comes with its own unique challenges. Gamers refer to latency using the term "ping", after a utility which measures round-trip network communication delays (by the use of ICMP packets). A player on a DSL connection with a 50-ms ping can react faster than a modem user with a 350-ms average latency. Other problems include packet loss and choke, which can prevent a player from "registering" their actions with a server. In first-person shooters, this problem appears when bullets hit the enemy without damage. The player's connection is not the only factor; some servers are slower than others.

A server that is geographically closer to the player's connection will often provide a lower ping. Data packets travel faster to a location that is closer to them. How far the device is from an internet connection (router) can also affect latency.

== Hotseat ==
Hotseat or hot seat, also known as pass-and-play, is a multiplayer mode provided by some turn-based video games, which allows two or more players to play on the same device by taking turns playing the game. The term was first used as a reference to playing a PC game and trading seats with the other player, but the mode dates back to early 1980s arcade games. A notable example of games that use this mode is the Heroes of Might and Magic series, which allows up to 8 players to play locally on the same computer.

Hotseat multiplayer has also seen prominence on some console video games, especially certain multiplayer games that are intended to be family-friendly, within the party genre, or both. For example, the Wii games Wii Sports and Wii Sports Resort have certain sports, such as golf, that require its competitors to take turns. Players share a Wii Remote, the system's controller, which the current player has possession of during a turn.

Hotseat play allows players to play a multiplayer game with only one copy of the game on only one device. Since hotseat play is usually defined as turn-based by nature, the duration of a game may extend beyond that of a comparable real-time networked multiplayer game where each player can take action at the same time. Some games allow hotseat and networked players to compete with each other in the same game, while maintaining turn-based play. In those cases, hotseat enables N players to play on fewer than N physical computers.

== Asymmetrical gameplay ==
Asymmetrical multiplayer is a type of gameplay in which players can have significantly different roles or abilities from each other – enough to provide a significantly different experience of the game. In games with light asymmetry, the players share some of the same basic mechanics (such as movement and death), yet have different roles in the game; this is a common feature of the multiplayer online battle arena (MOBA) genre such as League of Legends and Dota 2, and in hero shooters such as Overwatch and Apex Legends. A first-person shooter that adopts the asymmetrical multiplayer system is Tom Clancy's Rainbow Six Siege. Giving players their own special operator changes every player's experience. This puts an emphasis on players improvising their own game plan given the abilities their character has. In games with stronger elements of asymmetry, one player/team may have one gameplay experience (or be in softly asymmetric roles) while the other player or team play in a drastically different way, with different mechanics, a different type of objective, or both. Examples of games with strong asymmetry include Dead by Daylight, Evolve, and Left 4 Dead.

=== Invasion Mode ===
Some games feature an "Invasion mode", which lets real players enter another player's single-player or multiplayer session to help, harass, or replace NPCs. The mechanic traces a clear lineage from early experiments to FromSoftware's Souls series and into modern titles such as Deathloop, Sniper Elite 5, and Elden Ring. It carries persistent design trade-offs involving balance, matchmaking, and griefing, while adding tension, unpredictability, and emergent social interaction to single-player content. Deathloop featured opt-in asymmetric PvP, while Elden Ring evolved the Souls invasion system at a larger scale.

Depending on the game, its objectives, and its story, the invading player's goals, roles, and objectives will differ. In hostile invasions, the invader's goal is to kill or disrupt the host, as in the classic Souls formula. In possession or control invasions, the invader can take control of NPCs or civilians, as Mindjack experimented with. In a co-op version, the invader can cooperate with the host to accomplish objectives as a unit, as seen in some open-world titles.

Notable milestones with this mode with concise timelines include:

- Demon’s Souls (2009) / Dark Souls (2011): popularized hostile, asynchronous invasions that reward risk and create high‑stakes PvP inside PvE.
- Journey (2012): introduced anonymous, non‑hostile drop‑in multiplayer—important contrast to invasions.
- Watch Dogs (2014) / Metal Gear Solid V (2015): experimented with invasions in open‑world/action contexts.

== Asynchronous multiplayer ==
Asynchronous multiplayer is a form of multiplayer gameplay where players are not necessarily playing at the same time. This form of multiplayer game has its origins in play-by-mail games, where players would send their moves through postal mail to a game master, who then would compile and send out results for the next turn. Play-by-mail games transitioned to electronic form as play-by-email games. Similar games were developed for bulletin board systems, such as Trade Wars, where the turn structure may not be as rigorous and allow players to take actions at any time in a persistence space alongside all other players, a concept known as sporadic play.

These types of asynchronous multiplayer games waned with the widespread availability of the Internet which allowed players to play against each other simultaneously, but remains an option in many strategy-related games, such as the Civilization series. Coordination of turns are subsequently managed by one computer or a centralized server. Further, many mobile games are based on sporadic play and use social interactions with other players, lacking direct player versus player game modes but allowing players to influence other players' games, coordinated through central game servers, another facet of asynchronous play.

== Online cheating ==
Online cheating (in gaming) usually refers to modifying the game experience to give one player an advantage over others, such as using an "aimbot" – a program which automatically locks the player's crosshairs onto a target – in shooting games. This is also known as "hacking" or "glitching" ("glitching" refers to using a glitch, or a mistake in the code of a game, whereas "hacking" is manipulating the code of a game). Cheating in video games is often done via a third-party program that modifies the game's code at runtime to give one or more players an advantage. In other situations, it is frequently done by changing the game's files to change the game's mechanics.

== See also ==
- Game server
- LAN gaming center
- Massively multiplayer online game
- Massively multiplayer online role-playing game
- Matchmaking (video games)
- Online game
- Play-by-mail game
- Spawn installation
- Split-screen gaming
