= Matthew 7:5 =

- ← 7:4 7:6 →
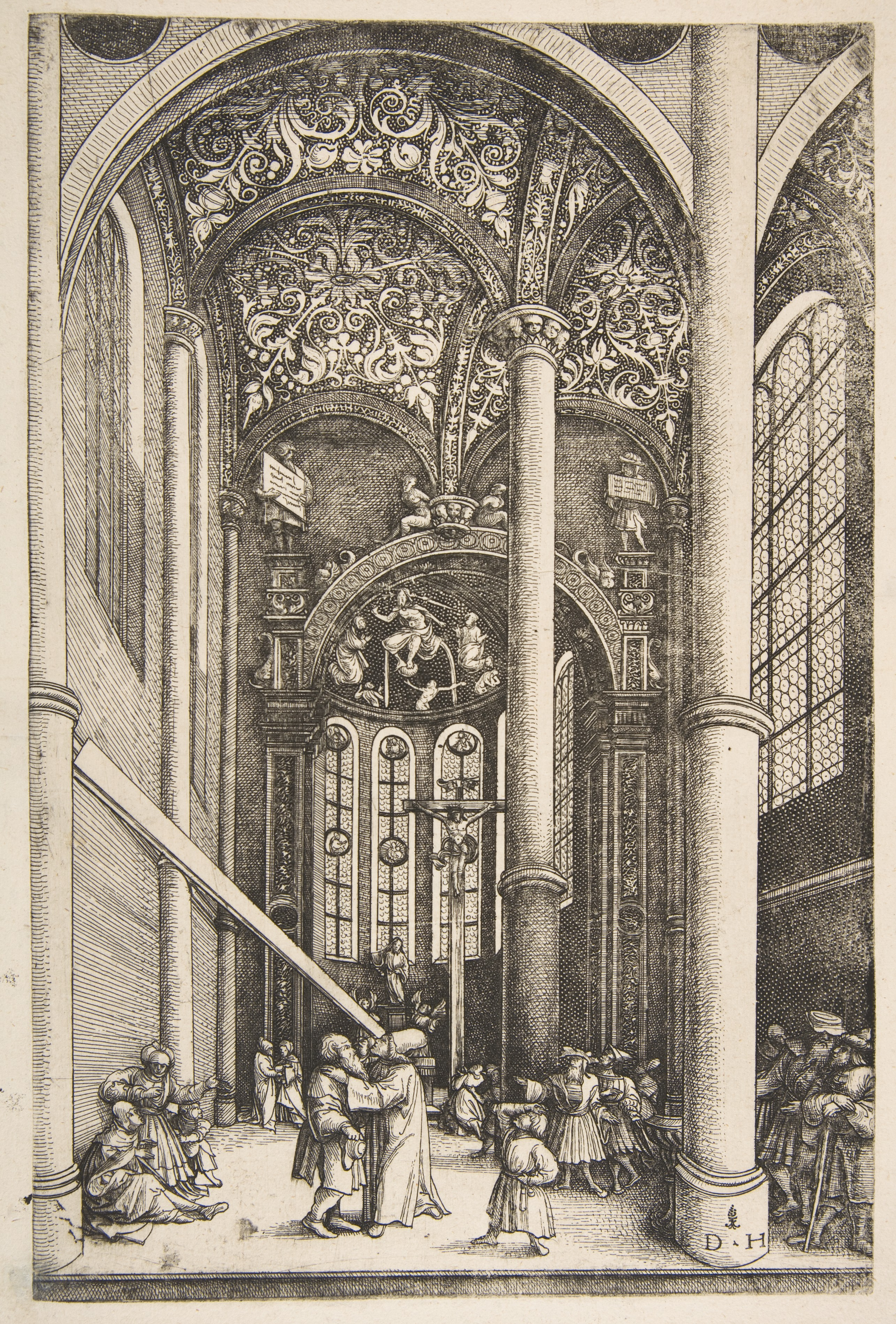
- Daniel Hopfer's "the Parable of the Mote and the Beam" (c. 1530). Interior of the Church of Saint Katherine's.
- Book: Gospel of Matthew
- Christian Bible part: New Testament

Matthew 7:5 is the fifth verse of the seventh chapter of the Gospel of Matthew in the New Testament and is part of the Sermon on the Mount. This verse continues the discussion of judgmentalism.

== Content ==
In the King James Version of the Bible the text reads:

Thou hypocrite, first cast out the beam out of thine own eye;
and then shalt thou see clearly to cast out the mote out of thy brother's eye.

The World English Bible translates the passage as:

You hypocrite! First, remove the beam out of your own eye, and then you can see clearly to remove the speck out of your brother’s eye.

The Novum Testamentum Graece text is:

ὑποκριτά, ἔκβαλε πρῶτον ἐκ τοῦ ὀφθαλμοῦ σοῦ τὴν δοκόν, καὶ τότε διαβλέψεις ἐκβαλεῖν τὸ κάρφος ἐκ τοῦ ὀφθαλμοῦ τοῦ ἀδελφοῦ σου.

== Analysis ==
This verse continues the metaphor of a person with a plank in their own eye who criticizes someone for a speck in that person's eye. In this verse, Jesus argues that one must first remove the plank before going on to remove the speck. This verse warns against hypocrisy, seeing the flaw (sin) in another while ignoring the obvious sin in one's own lives. Jesus always made clear that judging was to be done by the Father, and humans should concern themselves with making their own soul ready for acceptance into the kingdom of God. The focus should always be on God’s grace, and in obedience rooting out the sin in our lives rather than concerning ourselves with the sins of others.

The implication is that it is impossible for one to ever completely clear away their own flaws, and thus the opportunity to begin judging others will never arise. Hill sees this statement as in the same spirit as the famous "He who is without sin" teaching of John 8:7.

== Uses ==
Composer Georg Philipp Telemann uses this verse together with Psalm 139:11–12, and John 8:7 as the text in his cantata, Vor des lichten Tages Schein, TWV 1:1483 (Harmonischer Gottes-Dienst, Hamburg 1726.

== Commentary from the Church Fathers ==
Chrysostom: "And it is to be noted, that whenever He intends to denounce any great sin, He begins with an epithet of reproach, as below, Thou wicked servant, I forgave thee all that debt; (Mat. 18:32.) and so here, Thou hypocrite, cast out first. For each one knows better the things of himself than the things of others, and sees more the things that be great, than the things that be lesser, and loves himself more than his neighbour. Therefore He bids him who is chargeable with many sins, not to be a harsh judge of another’s faults, especially if they be small. Herein not forbidding to arraign and correct; but forbidding to make light of our own sins, and magnify those of others. For it behoves you first diligently to examine how great may be your own sins, and then try those of your neighbour; whence it follows, and then shalt thou see clearly to cast the mote out of thy brother’s eye".

Augustine: "For having removed from our own eye the beam of envy, of malice, or hypocrisy, we shall see clearly to cast the beam out of our brother’s eye".

Preceded by Matthew 7:4	Gospel of Matthew; Chapter 7	Succeeded by Matthew 7:6
