= Lilies of the Field =

Lilies of the Field is a phrase used in Matthew 6:28 in the Bible, part of a segment known also as The Birds of the Air.

Lilies of the Field may also refer to:

- The Lilies of the Field (novel) by William Edmund Barrett
  - Lilies of the Field (1963 film), a film adaption of the novel produced and directed by Ralph Nelson
- Lilies of the Field (1924 film), a silent American melodrama directed by John Francis Dillon
- Lilies of the Field (1930 film), an American melodrama directed by Alexander Korda
- Lilies of the Field (1934 film), a British romantic comedy film directed by Norman Walker
