= Matthew 7:6 =

- ← 7:5 7:7 →
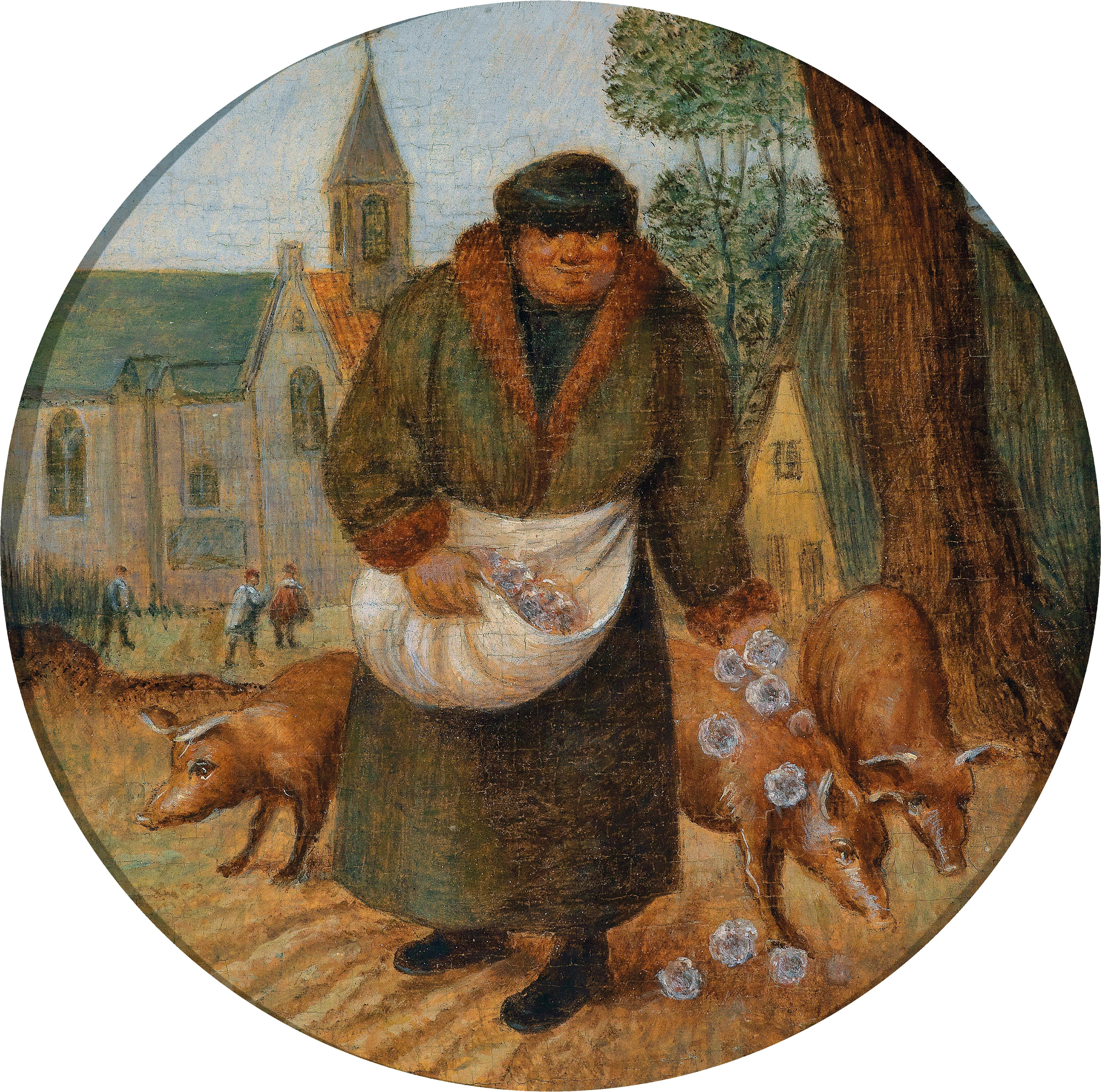
- "Cast pearls before swine" (from the series of "Flemish Proverbs"). Drawing by Pieter Brueghel the Younger (1564–1638).
- Book: Gospel of Matthew
- Christian Bible part: New Testament

Matthew 7:6, the sixth verse of the seventh chapter of the Gospel of Matthew in the New Testament, is part of the Sermon on the Mount. It refers to "casting pearls before swine".

== Content ==
The original Koine Greek, according to Westcott and Hort, reads:

μὴ δῶτε τὸ ἅγιον τοῖς κυσὶν μηδὲ βάλητε τοὺς μαργαρίτας
ὑμῶν ἔμπροσθεν τῶν χοίρων μήποτε καταπατήσουσιν αὐτοὺς
ἐν τοῖς ποσὶν αὐτῶν καὶ στραφέντες ῥήξωσιν ὑμᾶς

The Nestlé Aland reads:

"6. Μὴ δῶτε τὸ ἅγιον τοῖς κυσὶν μηδὲ βάλητε τοὺς μαργαρίτας ὑμῶν ἔμπροσθεν τῶν χοίρων, μήποτε καταπατήσουσιν αὐτοὺς ἐν τοῖς ποσὶν αὐτῶν καὶ στραφέντες ῥήξωσιν ὑμᾶς."

In the King James Version of the Bible the text reads:

Give not that which is holy unto the dogs, neither cast
ye your pearls before swine, lest they trample them
under their feet, and turn again and rend you.

The World English Bible translates the passage as:

Don't give that which is holy to the dogs, neither throw
your pearls before the pigs, lest perhaps they trample
them under their feet, and turn and tear you to pieces.

The New International Version provides a more colloquial interpretation for a contemporary worldview:

Do not give dogs what is sacred; do not throw your pearls to pigs. If you do, they may trample them under their feet, and turn and tear you to pieces.

For a collection of other versions see BibleHub Matthew 7:6

== Historical context ==
At the time, both dogs and pigs were poorly regarded. Dogs were part of society, but were half wild and roamed the region in packs that were sometimes dangerous to humans. The word used here refers specifically to dogs without a human master. They were unclean and would eat whatever scraps and carrion they came across. Pigs were the quintessential unclean animal and were closely associated with the Gentile communities in the region which kept them in large numbers. Pearls were a luxury of extreme value.

Another question raised by this metaphor is what link there is between pearls and pigs. One suggestion is that a related metaphor is found in Proverbs 11:22: "Like a gold ring in a pig's snout is a beautiful woman without discretion." Alternatively, the word pearls can be seen as a reference to the food prepared on holy days, which would never have been given to swine. Alternatively, the metaphor may be a reference to the immense appetites of pigs, and to how enraged they will be when they discover they cannot eat the pearls, and since they have no understanding of their greater value, will turn on the giver.

Nolland notes the work of Von Lips that advocates for two separate meanings. Pigs and dogs were thought of very differently. Parables from the period portray such dogs as dangerous urban animals. Pigs, while unclean, were docile and nonthreatening. Similarly, while what is holy is clearly something of God's, pearls were a sign of secular wealth with no religious connotations.

== Interpretations ==
The metaphor seems to be teaching against giving what is considered just or holy to those who do not appreciate it. Animals such as dogs and pigs cannot appreciate ethics, and this verse implies that there is even some class of human beings who cannot, either.

Historically, a common view was that this verse refers to the Eucharist, as exemplified in the Didache, which teaches that only baptized individuals ought to receive the Eucharist.

One modern argument is that dogs and pigs represent Gentiles and heathens, and that this verse is demonstrating the opinion that Jesus' original message was intended only for the Jews in contrast to the more mainstream interpretation of his ministry as being inclusive of both Jews and Gentiles. Harrington notes that such warnings are found in rabbinic works, although Harrington does not specify whether these Rabbinic works were pre-Christian or post-Christian. More recent peer-reviewed literature suggests that the connection between dogs and Gentiles in Rabbinic literature only appeared post-Christianity and was influenced by Christian exegesis on 2 Peter rather than originating within Rabbinic tradition. In 2 Peter 2:22, the author uses the terms dogs and swine to refers to heretics. According to Schweizer this verse was used by Jewish Christians to attack the Gentile churches, to argue that Gentile Christians would turn on the Jews by rejecting their laws and destroying Israel.

The dominant reading is that the two expressions are both referring to the same thing and the same group of people. To Nolland, this verse is not an attack on any particular group, but rather a continuation of the theme of God and Mammon begun at Matthew 6:24 and that verse is an attack on wasteful spending. We should put all of our resources to God, as everything is like dogs and pigs compared to him. Nolland also proposes that the verse might be to balance the other verses, that non-judgmentalism can only go so far and that there are some who should be excluded.

As Morris points out, this verse can also be read as a reasonable limit on evangelism. If a population or individual is not open to Christianity, leave and find a more receptive audience. As Morris points out, Jesus was silent before Herod and Paul abandoned the unsympathetic city of Corinth. Fowler links this to the earlier discussion of judgment. One should not judge severely, but there is a point at which any reasonable person will realize that those they are dealing with are dogs and swine.

The alternative interpretation is that dogs and pigs are not metaphors for some group of people, but for the unholy in general. This verse is not about excluding some group from God's teaching, but rather ensuring that those things that are God's are kept holy. Thus, the Temple is kept clean, religious meals treated with respect, and holy days honoured and kept separate from the turbulence and impiety of daily life.

In Divine Conspiracy, Dallas Willard offers another interpretation. In it, Jesus is not speaking of a wonderful treasure (the pearl), or whether the audience is fit to have it (the swine). Instead, he is observing that the pearl is not helpful. "Pigs cannot digest pearls, cannot nourish themselves upon them." He concludes that this reflects "our efforts to correct and control others by pouring out our good things" that our audience is not ready for, and that our seemingly good intentions will ultimately yield anger, resentment and attack by the audience. This turns the analogy into one that exposes one's self-superiority in thinking the other needs the unbidden advice.

All those points aside, one might usefully read through Matthew 13 when interpreting the phrase. The "pearls" may be like the seed sown by the farmer. If the farmer continues to sow on the rocky places, path or among thorns he may be foolish. The farmer may be wiser to sow in the good soil; or suffer weaker harvests (albeit the crops that do grow among weeds and/or thorns or in other, harder, places may prove more hardy: having survived and then been considered "good enough to keep" by the farmer despite the effects of the weeds and/or thorns). Like the seeds, pearls (of wisdom) placed before swine might simply be swallowed without being digested: repeated without understanding (perhaps as Jesus saw others of his time repeating scripture without understanding it). Matthew 13:44-46 opens this interpretation up a little further. As a more contemporary note, it is worth considering the sowing parables in light of subsequent monastic thought on selective breeding (see Augustinian Friar, Gregor Mendel and peas): the seeds from the crops that survived the weeds, thorns, path or rock may provide stronger, more durable, seed for sowing in all types of situation - albeit there may be differences in taste and quality to consider too.

One other interpretation reads this verse in light of the ones immediately preceding it (7:1–5) where instruction is given to not judge a brother and to remove the log from one's own eye before removing the speck from the eye of another. In this interpretation, the "holy things" and the "pearls" are the "brother" who might be cast amongst the "dogs" and the "swine" of the world by such actions.

== In popular culture ==
The phrase "pearls before swine" has become a common expression in English. A film was made in 1999, Pearls Before Swine, starring Boyd Rice and Douglas P., directed by Richard Wolstencroft. There is a Pearls Before Swine comic strip, a Pearls Before Swine American psychedelic folk band, and Pearls Before Swine is an alternate title for Kurt Vonnegut's novel God Bless You, Mr. Rosewater.

In the play A Streetcar Named Desire by Tennessee Williams, there is a reference: "But I have been foolish – casting my pearls before swine!" referring to this verse.

In the 1954 musical film Seven Brides for Seven Brothers the verse is quoted by Milly after comparing her new husband and his brothers to hogs for failing to say grace and for the way they rudely and voraciously began eating the first dinner she had prepared in her new home.

In Aerosmith's 1994 song "Eat the Rich" they say "But there's one good thing that happens when you toss your pearls to swine."

The pig-based Pokémon Spoink and Grumpig may be inspired by the idea of "casting pearls before swine". Spoink and Grumpig appear to use the pearls of wisdom to enhance their psychic powers.

In a 2019 episode during the fall final season of Fox network's "Empire", actor Terrence Howard's character, Lucious Lyon, says "Let's not cast pearl before swine" when meeting his rival character Damon Cross, played by Wood Harris.

In the sixth story arc of JoJo's Bizarre Adventure, Stone Ocean, the antagonist Enrico Pucci recites the verse word for word.

A common version of the saying in Spanish is echar margaritas a los cerdos, lit. 'to cast daisies before swine'. This comes from translating Greek μαργαρίτας (margarítas) as its Spanish false friend margaritas ("daisies").

== Commentary from the Church Fathers ==
Augustine: Because the simplicity to which He had been directing in the foregoing precepts might lead some wrongly to conclude that it was equally wrong to hide the truth as to utter what was false, He well adds, Give not that which is holy to the dogs, and cast not your pearls before swine.

Pseudo-Chrysostom: Otherwise; The Lord had commanded us to love our enemies, and to do good to those that sin against us. That from this Priests might not think themselves obliged to communicate also the things of God to such, He checked any such thought saying, Give not that which is holy to the dogs; as much as to say, I have bid you love your enemies, and do them good out of your temporal goods, but not out of My spiritual goods, without distinction. For they are your brethren by nature but not by faith, and God gives the good things of this life equally to the worthy and the unworthy, but not so spiritual graces.

Augustine: Let us see now what is the holy thing, what are the dogs, what the pearls, what the swine? The holy thing is all that it were impiety to corrupt; a sin which may be committed by the will, though the thing itself be undone. The pearls are all spiritual things that are to be highly esteemed. Thus though one and the same thing may be called both the holy thing and a pearl, yet it is called holy because it is not to be corrupted; and called a pearl because it is not to be contemned.

Pseudo-Chrysostom: Otherwise; That which is holy denotes baptism, the grace of Christ's body, and the like; but the mysteries of the truth are intended by the pearls. For as pearls are inclosed in shells, and such in the deeps of the sea, so the divine mysteries inclosed in words are lodged in the deep meaning of Holy Scripture.

Chrysostom: And to those that are right-minded and have understanding, when revealed they appear good; but to those without understanding, they seem to be more deserving reverence because they are not understood.

Augustine: The dogs are those that assault the truth; the swine we may not unsuitably take for those that despise the truth. Therefore because dogs leap forth to rend in pieces, and what they rend, suffer not to continue whole, He said, Give not that which is holy to the dogs; because they strive to the utmost of their power to destroy the truth. The swine though they do not assault by biting as dogs, yet do they defile by trampling upon, and therefore He said, Cast not your pearls before swine.

Rabanus Maurus: Or; The dogs are returned to their vomit; the swine not yet returned, but wallowing in the mire of vices.

Pseudo-Chrysostom: Otherwise; The dog and the swine are unclean animals; the dog indeed in every respect, as he neither chews the cud, nor divides the hoof; but swine in one respect only, seeing they divide the hoof, though they do not chew the cud. Hence I think that we are to understand by the dog, the Gentiles who are altogether unclean, both in their life, and in their faith; but by the swine are to be understood heretics, because they seem to call upon the name of the Lord. Give not therefore that which is holy to the dogs, for that baptism and the other sacraments are not to be given but to them that have the faith. In like manner the mysteries of the truth, that is, the pearls, are not to be given but to such as desire the truth and live with human reason. If then you cast them to the swine, that is, to such as are grovelling in impurity of life, they do not understand their preciousness, but value them like to other worldly fables, and tread them under foot with their carnal life.

Augustine: That which is despised is said to be trodden under foot: hence it is said, Lest perchance they tread them under foot.

Glossa Ordinaria: He says, Lest perchance, because it may be that they will wisely turn from their uncleanness.

Augustine: That which follows, Turn again and rend you, He means not the pearls themselves, for these they tread under foot, and when they turn again that they may hear something further, then they rend him by whom the pearls on which they had trode had been cast. For you will not easily find what will please him who has despised things got by great toil. Whoever then undertake to teach such, I see not how they shall not be trode upon and rent by those they teach.

Pseudo-Chrysostom: Or; The swine not only trample upon the pearls by their carnal life, but after a little they turn, and by disobedience rend those who offend them. Yea often when offended they bring false accusation against them as sowers of new dogmas. The dogs also having trode upon holy things by their impure actions, by their disputings rend the preacher of truth.

Chrysostom: Well is that said, Lest they turn; for they feign meekness that they may learn; and when they have learned, they attack.

Pseudo-Chrysostom: With good reason He forbade pearls to be given to swine. For if they are not to be set before swine that are the less unclean, how much more are they to be withheld from dogs that are so much more unclean. But respecting the giving that which is holy, we cannot hold the same opinion; seeing we often give the benediction to Christians who live as the brutes; and that not because they deserve to receive it, but lest perchance being more grievously offended they should perish utterly.

== See also ==
- Pearls before swine (disambiguation)
- 'Gold coins for cats', a similar idiom in Japanese culture

Preceded by Matthew 7:5	Gospel of Matthew; Chapter 7	Succeeded by Matthew 7:7
