= Matthew 7:2 =

- ← 7:1 7:3 →
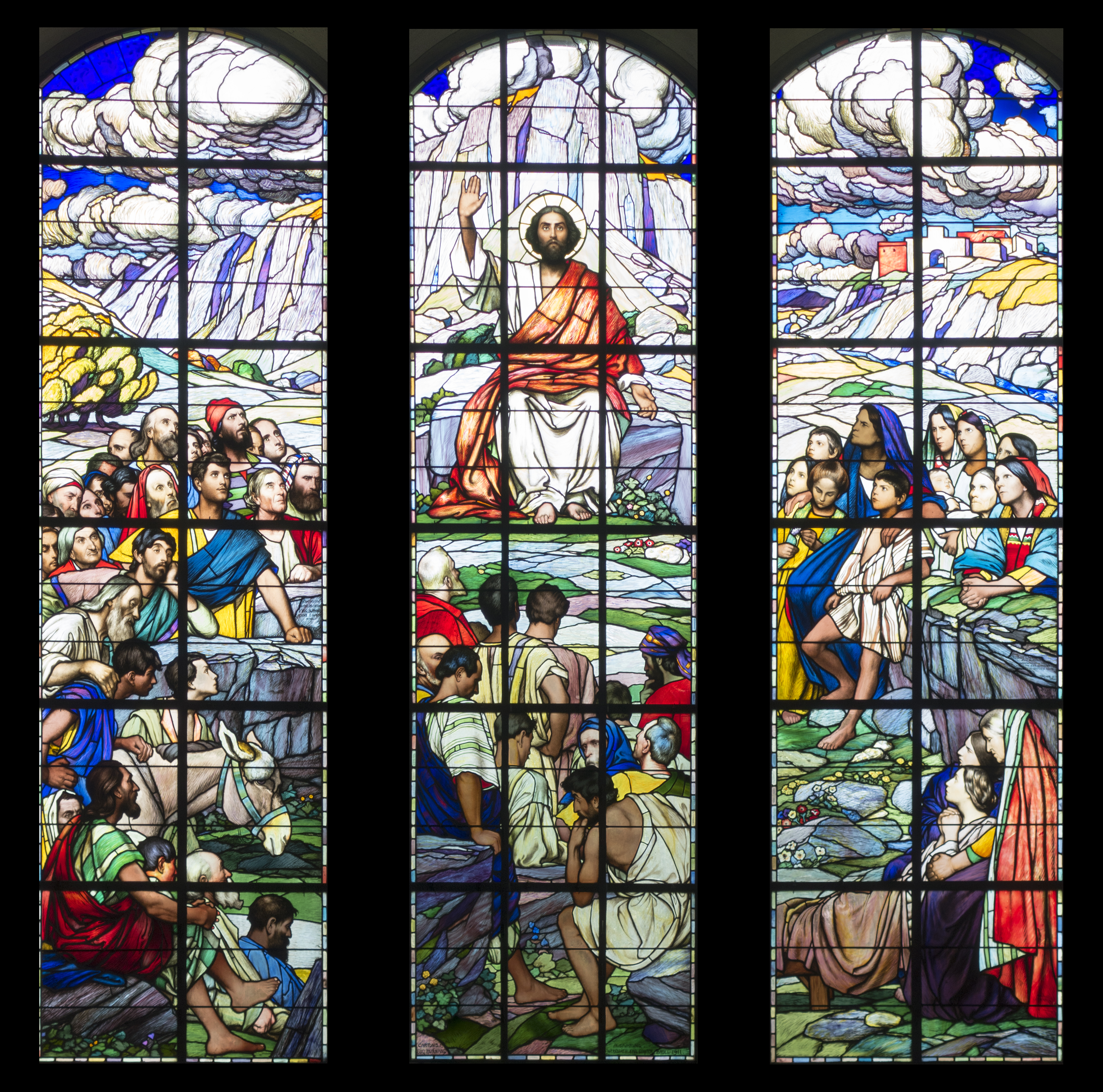
- "Sermon on the mount" windows at Herzogenbuchsee Reformed church near Berne. Picture by Eugène Burnand 1910, glass by Emil Gerster of Basel 1911
- Book: Gospel of Matthew
- Christian Bible part: New Testament

Matthew 7:2 is the second verse of the seventh chapter of the Gospel of Matthew in the New Testament and is part of the Sermon on the Mount. This verse continues the gospel's discussion of judgmentalism.

== Content ==
In the King James Version of the Bible the text reads:

For with what judgment ye judge, ye shall be judged:
and with what measure ye mete, it shall be measured to you again.

The World English Bible translates the passage as:

For with whatever judgment you judge, you will be judged;
and with whatever measure you measure, it will be measured to you.

The Novum Testamentum Graece text is:

ἐν ᾧ γὰρ κρίματι κρίνετε κριθήσεσθε,
καὶ ἐν ᾧ μέτρῳ μετρεῖτε μετρηθήσεται ὑμῖν.

For a collection of other versions see BibleHub Matthew 7:2

== Analysis ==
This verse simply states that he who judges will himself be judged. If you impose standards upon others, those same standards will be applied to you.

As Eduard Schweizer notes, this verse, if read literally, is a contradiction of the previous one. While the first says not to judge, this one established rules for judging. Ulrich Luz claims that this verse states that if you search to find faults with others, that God will then search to find fault with you, and since all humans are infinitely flawed you would then easily be condemned. Thus even a small amount of judging by a person will bring a great punishment from God, and this verse essentially repeats the argument of the first against judging. Most scholars simply believe that the condemnation of judging in Matthew 7:1 is far from absolute.

While, as in the previous verse, the wording seems to imply that God is the final judge, Fowler mentions other possibilities. This could be a teaching on healthy interpersonal relations, and the verse could be arguing that any who judges their fellows will themselves be judged by those around them. If you find fault with others, others will find fault with you. It could also refer to the danger of excessive internal criticism and self-consciousness. If you are constantly judging others, you will feel others are doing the same and will force yourself to try and meet their standards, in direct contrast to the condemnation of worry in the previous chapter.

The phrase "measure to measure", which also appears at Mark 4:24 in a different context, may be linked to the Rabbinic belief that God has two measures for the world - mercy and justice. This phrase is most notable for being reused as the title of the Shakespeare play Measure for Measure.

== Commentary from the Church Fathers ==
Augustine: I suppose the command here to be no other than that we should always put the best interpretation on such actions as seem doubtful with what mind they were done. But concerning such as cannot be done with good purpose, as adulteries, blasphemies, and the like, He permits us to judge; but of indifferent actions which admit of being done with either good or bad purpose, it is rash to judge, but especially so to condemn. There are two cases in which we should be particularly on our guard against hasty judgments, when it does not appear with what mind the action was done; and when it does not yet appear, what sort of man any one may turn out, who now seems either good or bad. Wherefore we should neither blame those things of which we know with what mind they are done, nor so blame those things which are manifest, as though we despaired of recovery. Here one may think there is difficulty in what follows, With what judgment ye judge ye shall be judged. If we judge a hasty judgment, will God also judge us with the like? Or if we have measured with a false measure, is there with God a false measure whence it may be measured to us again? For by measure I suppose is here meant judgment. Surely this is only said, that the haste in which you punish another shall be itself your punishment. For injustice often does no harm to him who suffers the wrong; but must always hurt him who does the wrong.

Augustine: Some say, How is it true that Christ says, And with what measure ye shall mete it shall be measured to you again, if temporal sin is to be punished by eternal suffering? They do not observe that it is not said the same measure, because of the equal space of time, but because of the equal retribution—namely, that he who has done evil should suffer evil, though even in that sense it might be said of that of which the Lord spoke here, namely of judgments and condemnations. Accordingly, he that judges and condemns unjustly, if he is judged and condemned, justly receives in the same measure though not the same thing that he gave; by judgment he did what was unjust, by judgment he suffers what is just.

Preceded by Matthew 7:1	Gospel of Matthew; Chapter 7	Succeeded by Matthew 7:3
