= Pig (disambiguation) =

A pig is a mammal of the genus Sus.

Pig, PIG, Pigs or PIGS may also refer to:

== Animals ==
- Wild boar (wild pig or Eurasian wild boar), Sus scrofa, the species from which the domestic pig was bred
- Sus, a genus within the pig family, including Sus scrofa and closely related southeast Asian species
- Suinae, a pig subfamily, including Sus and other genera from Africa and southeast Asia
- Suidae, a family of animals, including Suinae and other extinct Old World subfamilies
- Suina, a suborder of mammals including Suidae, and the Tayssuidae (peccaries or "New World pigs")
- Hell pigs or terminator pigs, the Entelodonts, a family of extinct mammals

== Places ==
- Pig, Kentucky, US
- Pine Island Glacier, a glacier of Antarctica

== Arts, entertainment, and media ==
=== Films ===
- Pigs (1973 film), a horror film
- Pigs (1992 film) or Psy, a film by Wladyslaw Pasikowski
- Pig (1998 film), a 1998 film written by and starring Rozz Williams
- Pigs (2007 film), a film by Karl DiPelino
- Grisen (Danish for The Pig), 2008 Danish short film with Jesper Asholt
- Pig (2010 film), a horror film by Adam Mason
- Pig (2011 film), a film written by Henry Barrial
- Pig (2018 film), an Iranian film
- Pig (2021 film), an American drama film starring Nicolas Cage

=== Games ===
- Pig (dice game), a dice game
- P-I-G, a variation of the basketball game H-O-R-S-E
- Pig, a variation of the card game Spoons

=== Literature ===
- Pig (novel), by Andrew Cowan
- "Pig" (short story), by Roald Dahl

=== Music ===
==== Albums and projects ====
- Pig (musical project), musical project by Raymond Watts
- Pigs (Asphalt Ballet album), 1993

==== Songs ====
- "Pig" (song), a 1998 song by the Dave Matthews Band
- "Pig", a song by Seether from Disclaimer II
- "PIG", an early demo version of "Mr. Jack" by System of a Down
- "Pig", a bonus song from Weezer Deluxe Edition
- "PIG", a song by Overkill from White Devil Armory
- "Pigs (Three Different Ones)", a 1977 song by Pink Floyd
- "Pigs", a track on Cypress Hill, Cypress Hill's first album
- "Pigs", a song by Eyehategod from In the Name of Suffering
- "Pigs", a song by Tyler, the Creator from Wolf

=== Video games ===
- Pigs (Angry Birds), fictional characters in the Angry Birds franchise

=== Television ===
- Evie Pig, a fictional character on Peppa Pig

== Military ==
- Humber Pig, a British armoured truck, typically used in riot control
- General Dynamics F-111C, Royal Australian Air Force variant of the F-111 bomber nicknamed the pig
- M60 machine gun, nicknamed "the pig"
- Maiale (pig), a low speed human torpedo; see Midget submarine#Italy

== Science and technology ==
- Apache Pig, a MapReduce programming tool used on Hadoop, language Pig Latin
- Pig, another term for ingot
- Pipeline inspection gauge, a form of pipeline maintenance used in pigging
- Pig, a small sandbag used for flood control inside a building
- PIGS (gene), a human gene
- Distillation pig, a piece of glassware that allows fractions to be collected without breaking vacuum
- Lead pig, a container made of lead shielding for storing and transporting radioactive materials
- The pig (tool), a type of axe used in firefighting

== Other uses ==
- Pig, a derogatory term for a police officer
- Pig (zodiac), a sign of the Chinese zodiac
- Pisabo language (ISO 639-3 code: pig)
- PIGS (economics), the economies of Portugal, Italy, Greece, Spain, and sometimes Ireland
- New Zealand DX class locomotive (DXR 8007 nicknamed "the pig")

== See also ==
- Boar (disambiguation)
- Guinea pig (disambiguation)
- Hog (disambiguation)
- Pigg (disambiguation)
- Piggy (disambiguation)
- Piglet (disambiguation)
- Swine (disambiguation)
