= Guinea pig (disambiguation) =

A guinea pig is a domestic rodent.

Guinea pig may also refer to:

- Guinea pig, a colloquial term for a test subject of any species:
  - Human subject research
  - Animal testing
- The Guinea Pig Club, a group of surgical patients
- 100,000,000 Guinea Pigs, a 1933 book about the pharmaceutical and food industries
- Guinea Pig (film series), a controversial series of Japanese films
- Guinea Pig (TV series), a Discovery Channel series
- The Guinea Pig (film), a 1948 film starring Richard Attenborough
- The Guinea Pig (play), a 1929 comedy by Preston Sturges
- The Guinea Pig EP, the first album released by the band Angry Salad

== See also ==
- Guinea (disambiguation)
- Pig (disambiguation)
