= Piglet =

Piglet may refer to:

== Animals ==
- Piglet, the young offspring of the domestic pig
- Suckling pig, a farmed piglet raised on mother's milk and slaughtered for food
- Banded piglet squid (Helicocranchia pfefferi), a small squid species
- Moss piglet, or tardigrade, a microscopic water-dwelling animal

== Literature ==
- Piglet (Winnie-the-Pooh), a character from A.A. Milne's Winnie-the-Pooh books and related media
- The piglets, characters from the novel Animal Farm
- Piglet (novel), by Lottie Hazell

== Music ==
- Piglet (band), an American math-rock band formed in 2005
- The Piglets, a 1970s British session band credited for songs by Jonathan King
- "Piglet", a 1998 song by Arab Strap from Philophobia

== Other uses ==
- Piglet (gamer), Chae Gwang-jin, South Korean professional League of Legends player and coach
- Piglet (Adventure Time character), in the 39th episode "The Pods"
- "Piglets" (Teletubbies), a 1998 TV episode
- Piglet Tournament of Cookbooks (or just "the Piglet"), a cookbook contest held by the website Food52
- Piglets (TV series), a British TV sitcom

== See also ==
- Pig (disambiguation)
