= Hog =

Hog or HOG may refer to:

== Animals ==
- Pig
  - Sometimes referring to other animals in the family Suidae, including:
    - Warthog
    - Red river hog
    - Giant forest hog
- Groundhog
- Hedgehog
- Hog (sheep), a yearling sheep, as yet unshorn

== Other uses ==
- Harley-Davidson, a motorcycle manufacturer
  - Harley Owners Group
- The Hogs (American football), a prior nickname for the offensive line of the Washington Redskins
- Hogging and sagging, a nautical term
- Hogging (sexual practice)
- Higher order grammar
- Histogram of oriented gradients, used in computer vision and image processing for the purpose of object detection
- House of Guitars
- Arkansas Razorbacks, the sports teams of the University of Arkansas
- Frank País Airport, IATA symbol HOG
- Hidden object game, a genre of casual puzzle games
- Hogarthian or Hog, a scuba diving gear configuration pioneered by William Hogarth Main
- Heart of Georgia Railroad, an American shortline railroad
- French branch of the Armenian Relief Committee, Armenian: Hay(astali) Oknoutian Gomidé, HOG

== See also ==
- Sandhog, the slang term given to urban miners, construction workers who work underground
- Server hog, places excessive load on a server such that the server performance as experienced by other clients is degraded
- Swine (disambiguation)
- Water hog, a machine that removes water from sports grounds
- Pig (disambiguation)
- Boar (disambiguation)
