= The Birds of the Air =

Discourse given by Jesus during his Sermon on the Mount

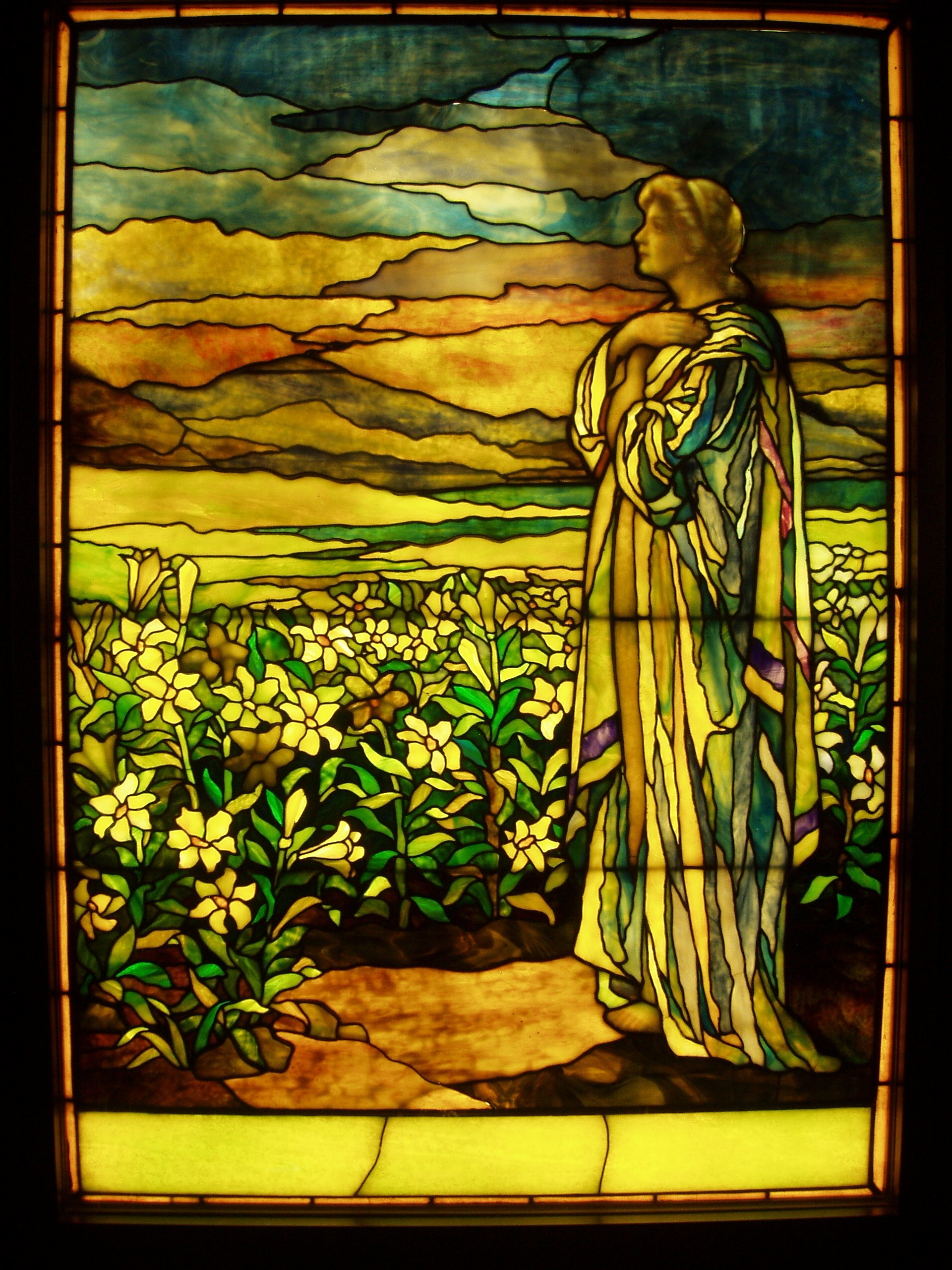
Field of Lilies – Tiffany Studios, c. 1910

The Birds of the Air (also referred to as The Fowls of the Air or The Lilies of the Field) is a discourse given by Jesus during his Sermon on the Mount as recorded in the Gospel of Matthew and the Sermon on the Plain in the Gospel of Luke in the New Testament. The discourse makes several references to the natural world: ravens (in Luke), lilies and moths are all mentioned.

From Matthew 6, 25–33:

Therefore I tell you, do not worry about your life, what you will eat or what you will drink,[a] or about your body, what you will wear. Is not life more than food and the body more than clothing? ²⁶Look at the birds of the air: they neither sow nor reap nor gather into barns, and yet your heavenly Father feeds them. Are you not of more value than they? ²⁷And which of you by worrying can add a single hour to your span of life?[b] ²⁸And why do you worry about clothing? Consider the lilies of the field, how they grow; they neither toil nor spin, ²⁹yet I tell you, even Solomon in all his glory was not clothed like one of these. ³⁰But if God so clothes the grass of the field, which is alive today and tomorrow is thrown into the oven, will he not much more clothe you—you of little faith? ³¹Therefore do not worry, saying, ‘What will we eat?’ or ‘What will we drink?’ or ‘What will we wear?’ ³²For it is the gentiles who seek all these things, and indeed your heavenly Father knows that you need all these things. ³³But seek first the kingdom of God[c] and his[d] righteousness, and all these things will be given to you as well.

— Matthew 6:25–6:33

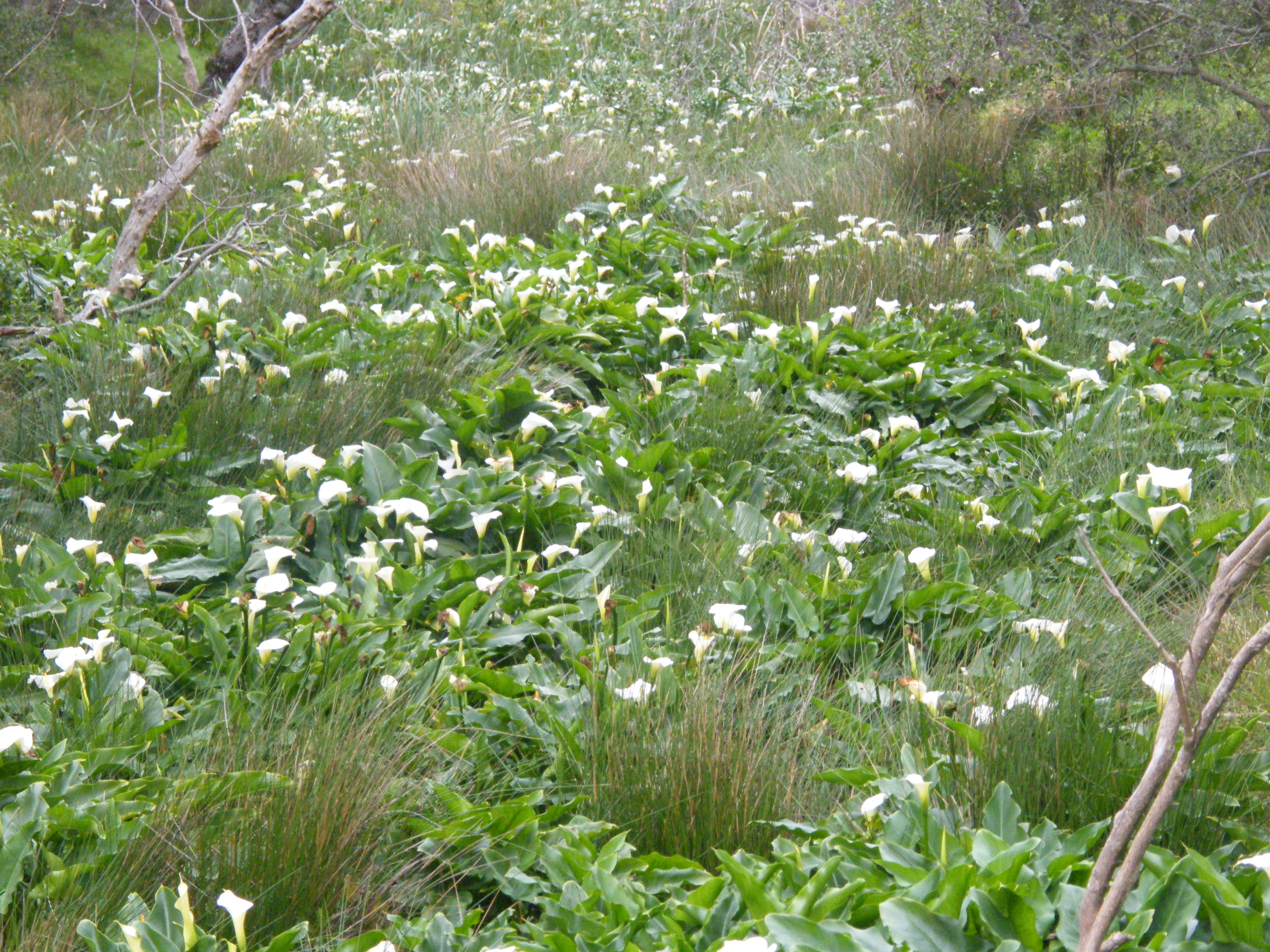
"...Consider the lilies of the field, how they grow; they toil not..."

From Luke 12, 22–32:

He said to his disciples, “Therefore I tell you, do not worry about your life, what you will eat, or about your body, what you will wear. ²³For life is more than food, and the body more than clothing. ²⁴Consider the ravens: they neither sow nor reap, they have neither storehouse nor barn, and yet God feeds them. Of how much more value are you than the birds! ²⁵And can any of you by worrying add a single hour to your span of life? ²⁶If then you are not able to do so small a thing as that, why do you worry about the rest? ²⁷Consider the lilies, how they grow: they neither toil nor spin; yet I tell you, even Solomon in all his glory was not clothed like one of these. ²⁸But if God so clothes the grass of the field, which is alive today and tomorrow is thrown into the oven, how much more will he clothe you—you of little faith! ²⁹And do not keep striving for what you are to eat and what you are to drink, and do not keep worrying. ³⁰For it is the nations of the world that strive after all these things, and your Father knows that you need them. ³¹Instead, strive for his kingdom, and these things will be given to you as well. ³²“Do not be afraid, little flock, for it is your Father’s good pleasure to give you the kingdom.

— Luke 12:22–32

The New King James Version incorporates Luke 12:33–34 within the same section:

Sell what you have and give alms; provide yourselves money bags which do not grow old, a treasure in the heavens that does not fail, where no thief approaches nor moth destroys. For where your treasure is, there your heart will be also.

== Commentary ==
Augustine of Hippo says that this parable should be taken at face value and not allegorized. Its meaning is clearly stated: "But seek first the kingdom of God and his righteousness, and all these things will be given to you as well."

Danish philosopher Søren Kierkegaard often referred to Matthew 6:26. For him the birds of the air and the lilies of the field represented instructors in "religious joy", an appreciation that "there is a today". For him learning joy was to learn to let go of tomorrow, not in the sense of failing to plan or provide, but in giving one's attention to the tasks of today without knowing what they will have meant.

Worldly worry always seeks to lead a human being into the small-minded unrest of comparisons, away from the lofty calmness of simple thoughts. ... Should not the invitation to learn from the lilies be welcome to everyone ... As the ingenuity and busyness increase, there come to be more and more in each generation who slavishly work a whole lifetime far down in the low underground regions of comparisons. Indeed, just as miners never see the light of day, so these unhappy people never come to see the light: those uplifting, simple thoughts, those first thoughts about how glorious it is to be a human being.

M. Conrad Myers sees in the reference to Solomon "and all his glory" a subtle echo of Ecclesiastes 2:11 "But when I turned to all the works that my hands had wrought, and to the toil at which I had taken such pains, behold! all was vanity and a chase after wind, with nothing gained under the sun."

While various attempts have been made to identify the specific type of flower, G. E. Post suggests "lily" is here meant to include a wide assortment of wild flowers.

The Birds of the Air Life of Jesus: Parables and the Sermon on the Mount
Preceded by The Lord's Prayer in the Sermon on the Mount	New Testament; Events	Succeeded by Discourse on Judging in the Sermon on the Mount
