= Pigg =

Pigg may refer to:

== People ==
- Alexandra Pigg (born 1962), British actress who first came to prominence as Petra Taylor in the TV soap opera Brookside
- Billy Pigg (1902–1968), English player of Northumbrian smallpipes
- Charles Pigg (1856–1929), English cricketer, golfer and tutor
- Herbert Pigg (1856–1913), English cricketer
- Landon Pigg (born 1983), singer-songwriter and actor from Nashville, Tennessee

== Other uses ==
- Pigg River, in Virginia, United States

== See also ==
- Pig (disambiguation)
