= Dzik =

Dzik, wild boar in Polish, may refer to:

- AMZ Dzik, an armored car
- Jerzy Dzik (born 1950), a Polish paleontologist
- ORP Dzik, various Polish Navy ships named Dzik
- ST Dzik, a tugboat operated by the Polish government from 1948 to 1961 or later
- Dzik, a Yucatecan cold meat salad, also known as Salpicón de res
