= ORP Dzik =

Dzik has been the name of three ships of the Polish Navy:

- ORP Dzik (P52), a British U-class submarine transferred to the Polish Navy and serving between 1942 and 1946
- ORP Dzik (293), a Foxtrot-class submarine
- ORP Dzik (1957), a T43-class minesweeper
