= Hypocrisy =

Practice of feigning to be what one is not or believing what one does not

Hypocrisy is the practice of feigning what one is not or professing what one does not believe. The word "hypocrisy" entered the English language c. 1200 with the meaning "the sin of pretending to virtue or goodness". Today, "hypocrisy" often refers to advocating behaviors that one does not practice. However, the term can also refer to other forms of pretense, such as engaging in pious or moral behaviors out of a desire for praise rather than out of genuinely pious or moral motivations.

Definitions of hypocrisy vary. In moral psychology, it is the failure to follow one's own expressed moral rules and principles. According to British political philosopher David Runciman, "other kinds of hypocritical deception include claims to knowledge that one lacks, claims to a consistency that one cannot sustain, claims to a loyalty that one does not possess, claims to an identity that one does not hold". American political journalist Michael Gerson says that political hypocrisy is "the conscious use of a mask to fool the public and gain political benefit".

Hypocrisy has been a subject of folk wisdom and wisdom literature from the beginnings of human history. Increasingly, since the 1980s, it has also become central to studies in behavioral economics, cognitive science, cultural psychology, decision making, ethics, evolutionary psychology, moral psychology, political sociology, positive psychology, social psychology, and sociological social psychology.

== Etymology ==
The word hypocrisy comes from the Greek ὑπόκρισις (hypokrisis), which means "jealous", "play-acting", "acting out", "coward" or "dissembling". The word hypocrite is from the Greek word ὑποκριτής (hypokritēs), the agentive noun associated with ὑποκρίνομαι (hypokrinomai κρίση, "judgment" »κριτική (kritikē), "critics") presumably because the performance of a dramatic text by an actor was to involve a degree of interpretation, or assessment.

Alternatively, the word is an amalgam of the Greek prefix hypo-, meaning "under", and the verb krinein, meaning "to sift or decide". Thus the original meaning implied a deficiency in the ability to sift or decide. This deficiency, as it pertains to one's own beliefs and feelings, informs the word's contemporary meaning.

Whereas hypokrisis applied to any sort of public performance (including the art of rhetoric), hypokrites was a technical term for a stage actor and was not considered an appropriate role for a public figure. In Athens during the 4th century BC, for example, the great orator Demosthenes ridiculed his rival Aeschines, who had been a successful actor before taking up politics, as a hypocrites whose skill at impersonating characters on stage made him an untrustworthy politician. This negative view of the hypokrites, perhaps combined with the Roman disdain for actors, later shaded into the originally neutral hypokrisis. It is this later sense of hypokrisis as "play-acting", i.e., the assumption of a counterfeit persona, that gives the modern word hypocrisy its negative connotation.

== History ==
Hypocrisy became a major topic in English political history in the early 18th century. The Toleration Act 1688 allowed for certain rights, but it left Protestant nonconformists (such as Congregationalists and Baptists) deprived of important rights, including that of office-holding. Nonconformists who wanted office ostentatiously took the Anglican sacrament once a year to avoid the restrictions. High Church Anglicans were outraged and outlawed what they called "occasional conformity" in 1711 with the Occasional Conformity Act 1711. In the political controversies using sermons, speeches, and pamphlet wars, high churchmen and Nonconformists attacked their opponents as insincere and hypocritical, as well as dangerously zealous, in contrast to their own moderation.

In his famous book Fable of the Bees (1714) English author Bernard Mandeville (1670–1733) explored the nature of hypocrisy in contemporary European society. On the one hand Mandeville was a ‘moralist’ heir to the French Augustinianism of the previous century, viewing sociability as a mere mask for vanity and pride. On the other he was a ‘materialist’ who helped found modern economics. He tried to demonstrate the universality of human appetites for corporeal pleasures. He argued that the efforts of self-seeking entrepreneurs are the basis of emerging commercial and industrial society, a line of thought that influenced Adam Smith (1723–1790) and 19th-century utilitarianism. The tension between these two approaches, modes, ambivalences and contradictions—concerning the relative power of norms and interests, the relationship between motives and behaviours, and the historical variability of human societies. In the Enlightenment of the 18th century, discussions of hypocrisy were common in the works of Voltaire, Rousseau, and Montaigne.

In the 1750 to 1850 era, Whig aristocrats in England boasted of their special benevolence for the common people. They claimed to be guiding and counseling reforms to prevent the outbreaks of popular discontent that caused instability and revolution in Europe. Tory and radical critics accused the Whigs of hypocrisy—alleging they were deliberately using the slogans of reform and democracy to boost themselves into power while preserving their precious aristocratic exclusiveness.

Observers from the Continent commented on the English political culture. Liberal and radical observers noted the servility of the English lower classes, the obsession everyone had with rank and title, the extravagance of the aristocracy, a supposed anti-intellectualism, and a pervasive hypocrisy that extended into such areas as social reform.

=== United States ===
In the propaganda battles of World War II, Japan attacked American hypocrisy by emphasizing the injustice of the incarceration camps for Japanese in the United States. Radio Tokyo emphasized that the camps revealed the hypocritical American claim to democratic ideals and fair play. The propaganda quoted American founding fathers, neutral sources, and dissenting opinions from major American newspapers. Radio Tokyo utilized fictitious sources as well. It proclaimed the moral superiority of Japan while threatening to mistreat American POWs in retaliation.

American historian Martin Jay in The Virtues of Mendacity: On Lying in Politics (2012) explores how writers over the centuries have treated hypocrisy, deception, flattery, lying and cheating, slander, false pretenses, living on borrowed glory, masquerading, conventions of concealment, playacting before others and the arts of dissimulation. He assumes that politics is worthwhile, but since it is unavoidably linked to lying and hypocrisy, Jay concludes that lying must not be all that bad.

== Moral and religious codes ==
Many belief systems condemn hypocrisy.

=== Buddhism ===
In the Buddhist text Dhammapada, Gautama Buddha condemns a man who takes the appearance of an ascetic but is full of passions within.

=== Christianity ===
In some translations of the Book of Job, the Hebrew word chaneph is rendered as "hypocrite", though it usually means "godless" or "profane". In the Christian Bible, Jesus Christ condemns the scribes and Pharisees as hypocrites in the passage known as the Woes of the Pharisees. He also denounces hypocrites in more general terms in Matthew 7:5.

In the 16th century, John Calvin was critical of Nicodemites.

=== Islam ===
In Islam, Quranic Chapter 63 is often titled "The Hypocrites". Hypocrisy, called munafiq in Islam, is viewed as a serious sickness. The Qur'an rails against those who claim to be believers and peacemakers, thinking they are fooling God and others, but only fool themselves.

== Psychology ==
Hypocrisy has long been of interest to psychologists.

=== Carl Jung ===
In Switzerland Carl Jung (1875–1961) attributed hypocrisy to those who are not aware of the dark or shadow-side of their nature. Jung wrote:

Every individual needs revolution, inner division, overthrow of the existing order, and renewal, but not by forcing them upon his neighbors under the hypocritical cloak of Christian love or the sense of social responsibility or any of the other beautiful euphemisms for unconscious urges to personal power.

Jung went on:

It is under all circumstances an advantage to be in full possession of one's personality, otherwise the repressed elements will only crop up as a hindrance elsewhere, not just at some unimportant point, but at the very spot where we are most sensitive. If people can be educated to see the shadow-side of their nature clearly, it may be hoped that they will also learn to understand and love their fellow men better. A little less hypocrisy and a little more self-knowledge can only have good results in respect for our neighbor; for we are all too prone to transfer to our fellows the injustice and violence we inflict upon our own natures.

In New Paths in Psychology Jung pointedly referred to the "hypocritical pretenses of man". "Dream-analysis above all else mercilessly uncovers the lying morality and hypocritical pretences of man, showing him, for once, the other side of his character in the most vivid light". Jung omitted this characterization from his later essay On the Psychology of the Unconscious, which developed out of the former.

=== Preference for the effortless ===
Genuinely being fair is one way to cultivate a reputation for fairness, but it is harder to be fair than to merely appear fair. Since laziness is considered deeply rooted in human nature, people are more likely to choose appearing fair over actually being fair.

=== Self-deception ===
"So convenient a thing is it to be a reasonable creature, since it enables one to find or make a reason for everything one has a mind to do." Benjamin Franklin's observation has been confirmed by recent studies in self-deception. In everyday reasoning, humans do little to get real evidence when taking positions or making decisions, and do even less to get evidence for opposing positions. Instead, they tend to fabricate "pseudo-evidence" – often after the decision had already been made ("post hoc fabrication").

Humans take a position, look for evidence that supports it, then, if they find some evidence – enough so that the position "makes sense" – they stop thinking altogether (the "makes-sense stopping rule"). And, when pressed to produce real evidence, they tend to seek and interpret "evidence" that confirms what they already believe (the "confirmation bias").

Moreover, humans tend to think highly of themselves, highlighting strengths and achievements, and overlooking weaknesses and failures (the "self-serving bias"). When asked to rate themselves on virtues, skills, or other desirable traits (including ethics, intelligence, driving ability, and sexual skills), a large majority say they are above average. Power and privilege magnify the distortion: 94% of college professors think that they do above average work. This effect is weaker in Asian countries and in other cultures which value the group more highly than the self.

=== Evolutionary psychology ===
Evolutionary psychologist Robert Kurzban argues that one's moral modules lead one to condemn infidelity while mating modules induce one to commit it.

=== Self-ignorance ===
Robert Wright wrote that "Human beings are a species splendid in their array of moral equipment, tragic in their propensity to misuse it, and pathetic in their constitutional ignorance of the misuse." Humans are very good at challenging the beliefs of other people, but when it comes to their own beliefs, they tend to protect them, not challenge them. A consistent finding of psychological research is that humans are fairly accurate in their perceptions of others, but generally inaccurate in their perceptions of themselves. Humans tend to judge others by their behavior, but think they have special information about themselves – that they know what they are "really like" inside – and thus effortlessly find ways to explain away selfish acts, and maintain the illusion that they are better than others.

== Social psychology ==
Social psychologists have generally viewed hypocrisy as an instantiation of attitudinal and/or behavioral inconsistency. Accordingly, many social psychologists have focused on the role of dissonance in explaining individuals' aversion to hypocritical thinking and behavior. Individuals are motivated to avoid hypocritical stances in order to forestall the negative drive state of dissonance. For example, a dissonance-based study on the use of condoms among young adults showed that induced hypocrisy can lead to increased purchase and use of condoms.

Alternatively, some social psychologists have suggested that individuals view hypocrisy negatively because it suggests that hypocrites are providing a false signal regarding their moral goodness.

== Philosophy ==
Hypocrisy has been an intermittent topic of interest to philosophers. Niccolò Machiavelli famously noted that "the mass of mankind accept what seems as what is; nay, are often touched more nearly by appearances than by realities". Philosophical issues raised by hypocrisy can be broadly divided into two kinds: metaphysical/conceptual and ethical. Most philosophical commentary on hypocrisy is concerned with the ethical questions it raises: is hypocrisy morally wrong or bad? If it is, is there anything distinctly objectionable about it, or can it be easily subsumed under a broader category of morally objectionable conduct–for example, deceit? Is hypocrisy necessary or desirable for the sake of certain valuable activities–most notably, politics?

Recently, hypocrisy has emerged as a key focus in philosophical discussions of the ethics of blame. It seems that even if a person has violated some moral norm and is genuinely blameworthy for doing so, it is open to them to challenge the blame leveled at them on the grounds that it is hypocritical; a typical expression of this idea is the phrase, "You have no right to blame me!" Accordingly, some philosophers argue that in order to have the standing or entitlement to blame others, one's blame must not be hypocritical. Defenses of this position have usually focused on the connection between hypocrisy and fairness: the basic idea is that the hypocritical blamer in some way fails to treat the target of her blame as a moral equal. Other proposed explanations include the idea that standing in a moral community requires a reciprocal willingness to accept blame, a willingness that hypocrites lack. Patrick Todd argues that all and only those who are committed to the relevant norms possess the standing to blame, and hypocrites lack commitment in the relevant sense. Other philosophers reject the "No-hypocrisy" condition on standing altogether. Typically, these philosophers do not deny that sometimes the wrongness of hypocrisy can outweigh a would-be blamer's entitlement to blame others; but they will insist that this is not invariably the case, and some hypocrites do have standing to blame. R.A. Duff suggests that underlying the disagreement between these two views is a disagreement about the size and scope of moral community, while Kyle Fritz and Daniel Miller suggest that the rejection of the "No-hypocrisy" condition reflects a failure to distinguish between the right to blame and the value of blaming.

The definition of hypocrisy itself is the fundamental question of the relatively new philosophical discussions on hypocrisy. Early answers tended to focus on the deceptive or inconsistent qualities of hypocrisy. For Eva Kittay, for example, the fundamental attribute of hypocrites is "self-referential deception," and for Gilbert Ryle, to be hypocritical is to "try to appear activated by a motive other than one's real motive." On Dan Turner's view, by contrast, the fundamental feature is "conflict or disparity" between a person's attitudes, where this may or may not involve deception. Bela Szabados and Daniel Statman argue that self-deception is the characteristic attribute of "garden variety of hypocrisies." Roger Crisp and Christopher Cowten identify four types of hypocrisy: pretense of moral goodness, moral criticism of others by those possessing faults of their own, failure to satisfy self-acknowledged moral requirements, and a complacent, unreflective commitment to virtues feigned or preached. What unifies these types is a "metavice," a lack of "moral seriousness." More recently, some philosophers–notably, Benjamin Rossi and Fritz and Miller–have defined hypocrisy in terms of dispositions to blame others or to avow commitment to certain norms together with an unwillingness to accept blame from others or to blame themselves. Rossi's "Commitment Account of Hypocrisy" addresses paradigmatic cases of hypocrisy that Fritz and Miller's "Differential Blaming Disposition Account" does not include.

== Benefits ==
Although there are many negatives to hypocrisy, there can be benefits from it as well. There are also benefits from ignoring it. Political theorist Judith N. Shklar argues, in "Let Us Not Be Hypocritical," we are all too eager to construe even minor deviations from our opponents' professed beliefs as hypocrisy, rather than understandable imperfections and weaknesses to which everyone is prone.

Political journalist Michael Gerson notes that, "There is often hypocritical deception involved in political and diplomatic negotiations, which generally start with principled, nonnegotiable demands that are negotiated away in the process of finding a compromise." Gerson concludes:

hypocrisy is unavoidable and necessary. If people were required, at all times, to live up to ideals of honesty, loyalty and compassion in order for those ideals to exist, there would be no ideals. Being a moral person is a struggle in which everyone repeatedly fails, becoming a hypocrite in each of those moments. A just and peaceful society depends on hypocrites who ultimately refused to abandon the ideals they betray.

== See also ==
- Accusation in a mirror – Hate speech incitement technique
- Double standard – Inconsistent application of principles
- Playing the victim – Fabrication or exaggeration of victimhood
- Psychological manipulation – Exploitative type of social influence
- Psychological projection – Attributing parts of the self to others
- The Mote and the Beam – Parable of Jesus in the Gospel of Matthew
- The pot calling the kettle black – Proverbial idiom referring to an example of hypocrisy
- Threat – Indication of intent of harm
- Tu quoque – Fallacy regarding hypocrisy
- Virtue signalling – Pejorative term
- Whataboutism – Informal fallacy and propaganda strategy
