= Pearls Before Swine =

Pearls Before Swine may refer to:

- "Pearls before swine", a phrase from Matthew 7:6 in the Bible

== Literature ==
- Pearls Before Swine (comics), a comic strip by Stephan Pastis
- Coroner's Pidgin or Pearls Before Swine, a novel in the Albert Campion series by Margery Allingham
- God Bless You, Mr. Rosewater or Pearls Before Swine, a novel by Kurt Vonnegut

== Music ==
- Pearls Before Swine (band), an American psychedelic folk band formed by Tom Rapp
- "Pearls Before Swine", a 1993 song by Coldcut from Philosophy
- "Pearls Before Swine", a song by Corrosion of Conformity from Deliverance
- "Pearls before the Swine", a song by Machine Head from Unto the Locust
- "Pearls B4 the Swine", a song by Prince from One Nite Alone...

== Other uses ==
- Pearls Before Swine (film), a 1999 Australian film starring Boyd Rice
- Pearls Before Swine (musical), a 1986 Australian musical by Dennis Watkins and Chris Harriott

== See also ==
- Casting Pearls (album), an album by VOTA
- Casting Pearls, an album by Melys
- "Casting Pearls Before the Swine", a bonus song by Yngwie Malmsteen from Facing the Animal
- Peärls Before Swïne Experience, a classical music ensemble
