= Matthew 7:1 =

- ← 6:34 7:2 →
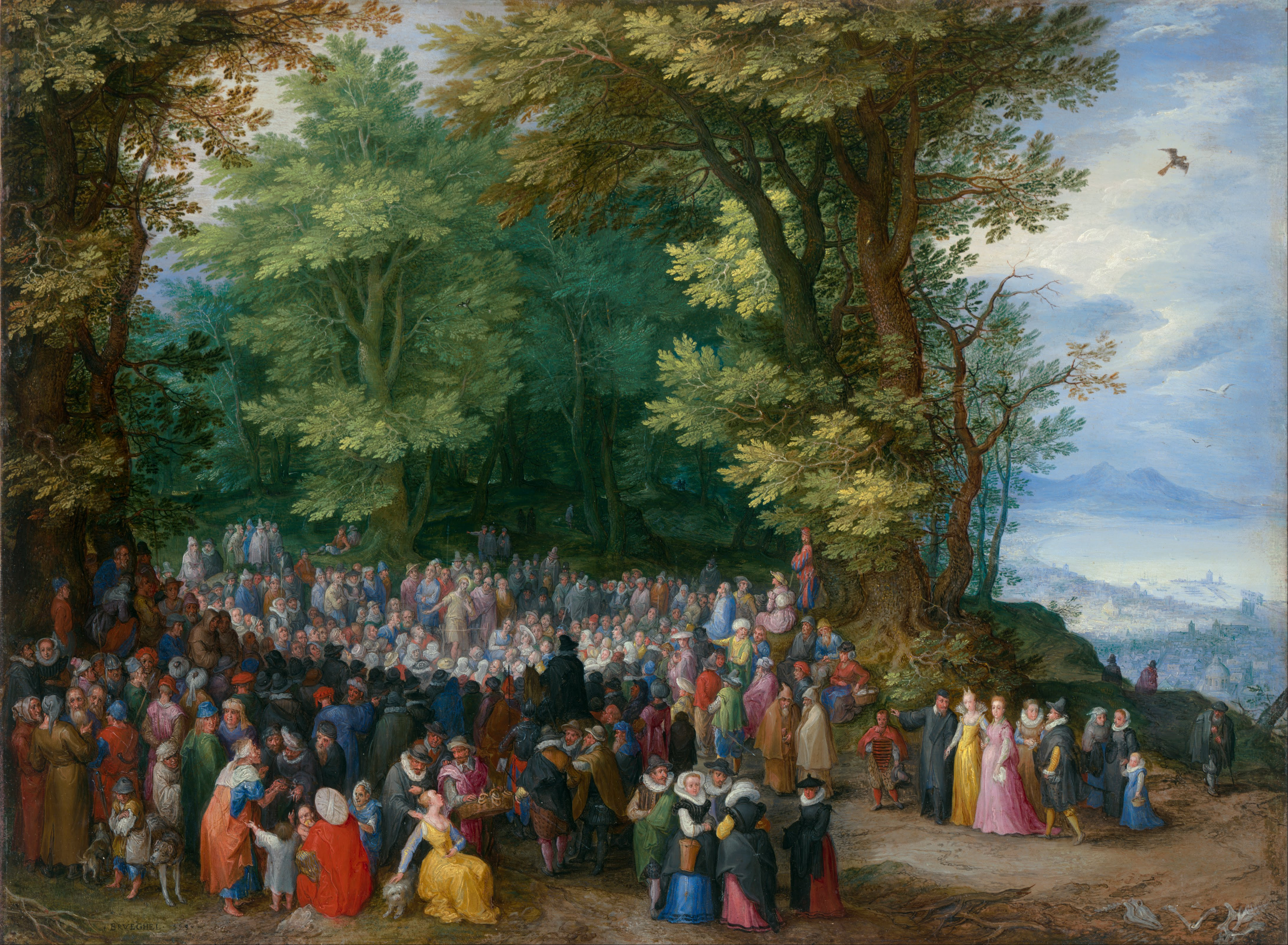
- "The Sermon on the Mount" by Jan Brueghel the Elder (1598).
- Book: Gospel of Matthew
- Christian Bible part: New Testament

Matthew 7:1 is the first verse of the seventh chapter of the Gospel of Matthew in the New Testament and is part of the Sermon on the Mount. This well-known verse begins the gospel's discussion of judgmentalism.

== Content ==
In the King James Version of the Bible, the text reads:

Judge not, that ye be not judged.

The World English Bible translates the passage as:

Don’t judge, so that you won’t be judged. (Note: For a collection of other versions see BibleGateway.com, Matthew 7.1.)

The Novum Testamentum Graece text is:

Μὴ κρίνετε, ἵνα μὴ κριθῆτε

== Analysis ==
This verse, which appears in a similar form in Luke's Sermon on the Plain, begins a discussion about how a person should relate to their fellows. Daniel Patte feels that this is a natural progression from the earlier discussion of how one should have a positive outlook for oneself to how one should also have a positive opinion of others. Craig Hill considers it to be one of the "most-cited" biblical quotations.

The judge mentioned in this verse is generally considered to be God. R. T. France notes that the author of Matthew frequently shifts to the passive voice when an action is carried out by God. This verse parallels Matthew 6:14, which states that the forgiving will themselves be forgiven.

The term translated as "judge", Greek: κρίνω (krinō), also implies condemnation, and not just judging. In this verse, Jesus warns that one who condemns others will themselves be condemned. The rest of the Bible, including the next verse, make clear that all manner of judgment is not being condemned. Thus while this verse is sometimes presented as an argument against all forms of disapprobation, most scholars believe that the context makes clear that this is a more limited decree. Obeying Christ's commands in this chapter does not preclude assessing another person's basic character—whether one is a dog (v. 6) or a false prophet (v. 15), or whether one's life shows fruit (v. 16)—since Scripture repeatedly exhorts believers to evaluate carefully.

Leon Morris states it is an attack on the hasty and unfair judgments, and as the further verses show it is also an attack on the hypocrites who criticize others while ignoring their own faults. A wide array of forms of judging are presented favourably elsewhere in the New Testament: the decisions of legal courts are seen as valid, the censoring of erroneous believers appears throughout the Bible, and the need for self judgment frequently praised. Some Christians do not accept this view. Some interpreters see this verse as an attack on the judicial powers of the state and the church and a call for radical egalitarianism. This view was embraced by many Anabaptist groups. As Luz notes, this verse also had an important impact on the theologies of asceticism and monasticism: rather than judge those in the world some Christian thinkers have argued that it is better to withdraw from it.

== Commentary from the Church Fathers ==
Augustine: Since when these temporal things are provided beforehand against the future, it is uncertain with what purpose it is done, as it may be with a single or double mind, He opportunely subjoins, Judge not.

Pseudo-Chrysostom: Otherwise; He has drawn out thus far the consequences of his injunctions of almsgiving; He now takes up those respecting prayer. And this doctrine is in a sort a continuation of that of the prayer; as though it should run, Forgive us our debts, and then should follow, Judge not, that ye be not judged.

Jerome: But if He forbids us to judge, how then does Paul judge the Corinthian who had committed uncleanness? Or Peter convict Ananias and Sapphira of falsehood?

Pseudo-Chrysostom: But some explain this place after a sense, as though the Lord did not herein forbid Christians to reprove others out of goodwill, but only intended that Christians should not despise Christians by making a show of their own righteousness, hating others often on suspicion alone, condemning them, and pursuing private grudges under the show of piety.

Chrysostom: Wherefore He does not say, ‘Do not cause a sinner to cease,’ but do not judge; that is, be not a bitter judge; correct him indeed, but not as an enemy seeking revenge, but as a physician applying a remedy.

Pseudo-Chrysostom: But that not even thus should Christians correct Christians is shown by that expression, Judge not. But if they do not thus correct, shall they therefore obtain forgiveness of their sins, because it is said, and ye shall not be judged? For who obtains forgiveness of a former sin, by not adding another thereto? This we have said, desiring to show that this is not here spoken concerning not judging our neighbour who shall sin against God, but who may sin against ourselves. For whoso does not judge his neighbour who has sinned against him, him shall not God judge for his sin, but will forgive him his debt even as he forgave.

Chrysostom: Otherwise; He does not forbid us to judge all sin absolutely, but lays this prohibition on such as are themselves full of great evils, and judge others for very small evils. In like manner Paul does not absolutely forbid to judge those that sin, but finds fault with disciples that judged their teacher, and instructs us not to judge those that are above us.

Hilary of Poitiers: Otherwise; He forbids us to judge God touching His promises; for as judgments among men are founded on things uncertain, so this judgment against God is drawn from somewhat that is doubtful. And He therefore would have us put away the custom from us altogether; for it is not here as in other cases where it is sin to have given a false judgment; but here we have begun to sin if we have pronounced any judgment at all.

== Cultural and literary usage ==
This verse has appeared many times in English literature and culture. It is referenced in sources as diverse as Lincoln's second inaugural address and Bob Marley's song "Judge Not".

== Notes ==
Preceded by Matthew 6:34	Gospel of Matthew; Chapter 7	Succeeded by Matthew 7:2
