= Swine (film) =

SWINE
- Directed by: Robbie Lockie; Damien Clarkson
- Screenplay by: Robbie Lockie; Damien Clarkson
- Produced by: Robbie Lockie; Damien Clarkson
- Starring: Tim Shieff
- Production companies: Growing Box Co; La Verita Studios
- Release date: 23 June 2016
- Running time: 16 minutes
- Country: United Kingdom
- Language: English

SWINE is a film written and directed by film-makers and campaigners Robbie Lockie and Damien Clarkson. The film is their first collaboration under the name Growing Box Co. and it has been commissioned by the charity Viva! as part of their campaign 'FaceOff'. The film suggests we are sleepwalking into a superbug pandemic. The film will be released online on 7 July 2016 and there will be a London screening.

== Plot ==
The film sees journalist Jack Tomlins (portrayed by runner Tim Shieff) go undercover in a UK factory farm to investigate rumours of a MRSA superbug outbreak in the pig population. In his search for the truth, he makes some shocking discoveries and all hangs in the balance.

== Reception ==
The film attracted some support from high-profile supporters actors Matt Lucas and Nicholas Hoult both tweeted about the film and expressed their support for its message.

Juliet Gellatley, Viva! founder and director wrote in HuffPost where she asks are we facing the future of antibiotic resistance?

== See also ==
- List of British films of 2016
