= Hogging (sexual practice) =

Form of misogyny

Hogging or sweat hogging refers to the practice of groups of men who target overweight or obese women, typically for sexual encounters. Unlike fat fetishists, men who participate in hogging are not necessarily sexually attracted to obese women's bodies; they aim to manipulate a female's emotional state or to derive amusement for themselves and their friends by engaging in sexual activities with women who are overweight.

== Practice ==
Individuals or groups have used hogging against women. Hogging often includes excessive alcohol consumption and emotional detachment. Hogging does not always include sexual intercourse, and often other sexual activities are the end goal. Participation sometimes includes making bets among male peers, as well as humiliating the woman involved.

The practice has also been suggested as a manifestation of hypermasculinity, in which men who do not fit into normative expectations of manhood exhibit insecurity, defensiveness, and sexual aggression to make up for their incapacity to meet masculine standards. In this manner, hogging is described as a form of sexual predation in which sex is an act of conquest, not intimacy.

== In society ==
In 2005, the Journal of Deviant Behaviour published a study of men's accounts of the practice. Writing in Inside Higher Ed the study's author claimed that its interviewers did not ask its interviewees if they had heard of the term, instead the author claimed "We simply asked them whether they had ever heard of a practice where men try to pick up women they deem fat or unattractive as part of a bet or for sex, and they responded, ‘Yeah, hogging.’”
