= Sermon on the Plain =

Set of teachings by Jesus in the Gospel of Luke

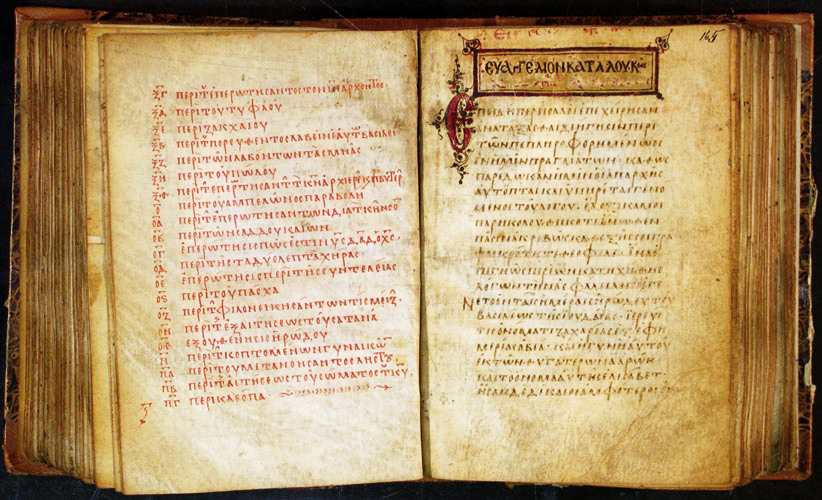
The beginning of the Gospel of Luke from the Codex Petropolitanus, 9th century

In Christianity, the Sermon on the Plain refers to a set of teachings by Jesus in the Gospel of Luke, in 6:20–49. This sermon may be compared to the longer Sermon on the Mount in the Gospel of Matthew.

Luke 6:12–20a details the events leading to the sermon. In it, Jesus spent the night on a mountain praying to God. Two days later, he gathered his disciples and selected 12 of them, whom he named Apostles. On the way down from the mountain, he stood at "a level place" (ἐπὶ τόπου πεδινοῦ, epi topou pedinou) where a throng of people had gathered. After curing those with "unclean spirits", Jesus began what is now called the Sermon on the Plain.

Notable messages in the Sermon include:

- The Beatitudes and woes (6:20–26)
- Love your enemies and turn the other cheek (6:27–36)
- Treat others the way you want to be treated (6:31)
- Don't judge and you won't be judged, don't condemn and you won't be condemned, forgive and you will be forgiven, give and you will receive (6:37–38)
- Can the blind lead the blind? Disciples are not above their teacher (6:39-40a)
- Remove the log from your own eye before attending to the splinter in your friend's (40b-42)
- A good tree does not produce bad fruit and a bad tree cannot produce good fruit, each tree is known by its fruit (43–45)
- Why do you call me Lord, Lord yet not do what I command? (46)
- Whoever follows these words of mine builds on rock and will survive, whoever does not builds on sand and will be destroyed (47–49)

In Luke 7:1 after Jesus had said everything he had to say to the crowd, he went to Capernaum, which in Lukan chronology he had not visited since Luke 4:31.

== See also ==
- Luke 6
- Jesus in Christianity
- Life of Jesus in the New Testament

Sermon on the Plain Life of Jesus: Sermon on the Mount or on the Plain
| Preceded by Commissioning the Twelve Apostles | New Testament; Events | Succeeded by Widow’s Son at Nain Raised; Miracles of Jesus |
