= Value judgment =

Philosophical and ethical concept

A value judgment (or normative judgment) is a judgement of the rightness or wrongness of something or someone, or of the usefulness of something or someone.

== Overview ==
A value judgment is a thought about something based on what it "ought" or "should" be given an opinion about what counts as "good" or "bad" — a contrast from a thought based on what the facts are. E.g. "The government should improve access to education" is a value judgment (that education is good). "People will buy less of our products if our price goes up" is not a value judgment because it is based on the fact that people tend to buy less of a more expensive product. It can be used either in a positive sense, signifying that a judgment must be made taking a value system into account, or in a disparaging sense, signifying a judgment made by personal whim rather than objective thought or evidence.

In its positive sense, a recommendation to make a value judgment is an admonition to consider carefully, to avoid whim and impetuousness, and search for consonance with one's deeper convictions, and to search for an objective, verifiable, public, and consensual set of evidence for the opinion. In its disparaging sense the term value judgment can imply that a conclusion is insular, one-sided, and not objective.

Value judgment also can refer to a tentative judgment based on a considered appraisal of the information at hand, taken to be incomplete and evolving—for example, a value judgment on whether to launch a military attack or as to procedure in a medical emergency.

=== Value-neutral ===
Value-neutral is a related adjective suggesting independence from a value system. The object itself is considered value-neutral when it is neither good nor bad, neither useful nor useless, neither significant nor trite until placed in some social context.

== Value judgments and their context ==
Some argue that true objectivity is impossible, that even the most rigorous rational analysis is founded on the set of values accepted in the course of analysis. Consequently, all conclusions are necessarily value judgments (and therefore may be parochial). Of course, putting all conclusions in one category does nothing to distinguish between them, and is, therefore, a useless descriptor. Categorizing a conclusion as a value judgment takes substance when the context framing the judgment is specified.

== See also ==
- Ad hominem
- Aesthetic judgment
- Bias
- Fact–value distinction
- Normativity
