= The Mote and the Beam =

Parable of Jesus in the Gospel of Matthew

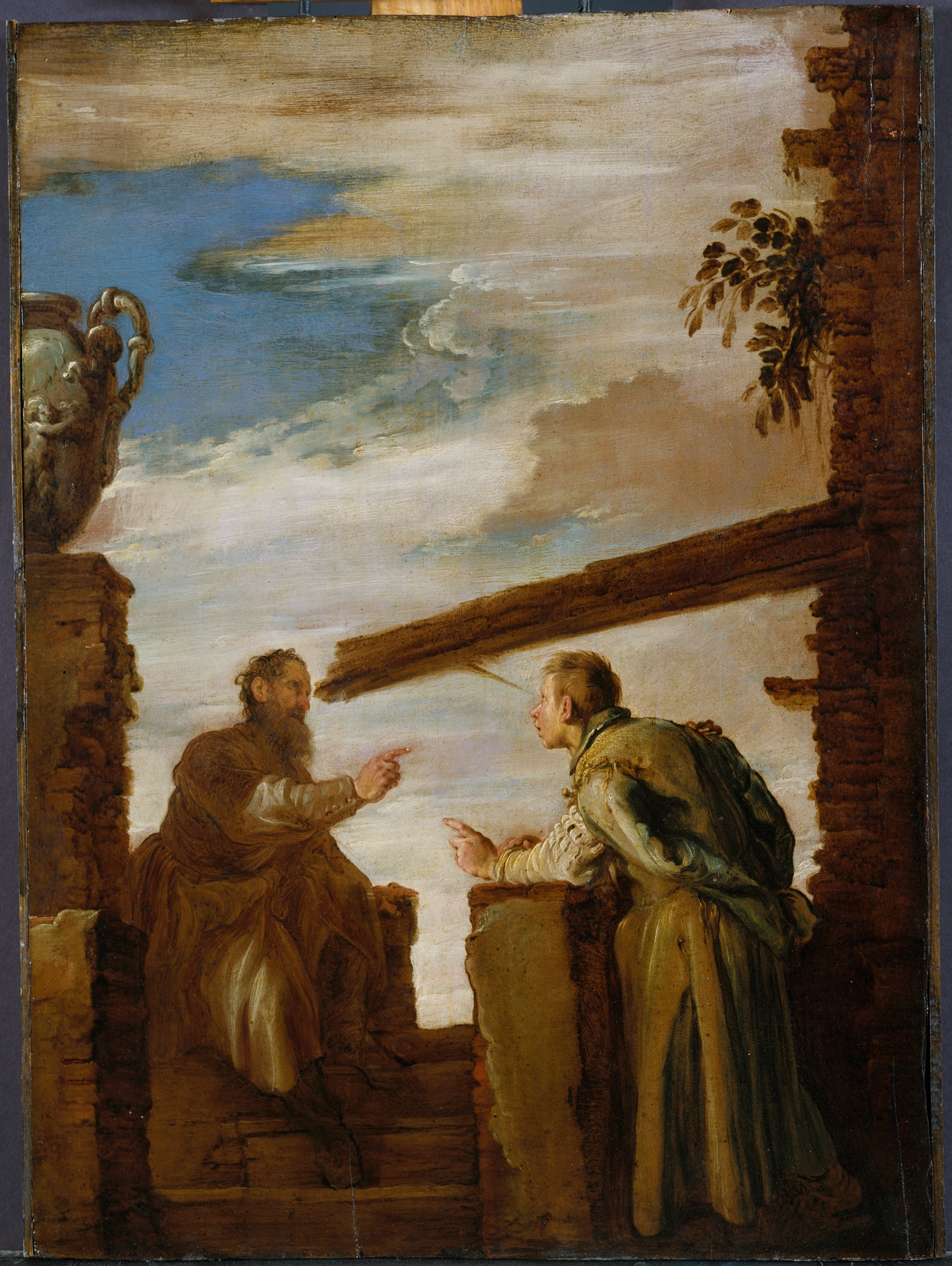
The Parable of the Mote and the Beam by Domenico Fetti c. 1619

The Mote and the Beam is a parable of Jesus given in the Sermon on the Mount in the Gospel of Matthew, chapter 7, verses 1 to 5. The discourse is fairly brief, and begins by warning his followers of the dangers of judging others, stating that they too would be judged by the same standard. The Sermon on the Plain has a similar passage in Luke 6:37–42.

== Narrative ==
In the Wycliffe and King James bibles, the word mote refers to a speck, and the beam is a wooden plank or log.

1 Judge not, that ye be not judged.
2 For with what judgment ye judge, ye shall be judged: and with what measure ye mete, it shall be measured to you again.
3 And why beholdest thou the mote that is in thy brother's eye, but considerest not the beam that is in thine own eye?
4 Or how wilt thou say to thy brother, Let me pull out the mote out of thine eye; and, behold, a beam is in thine own eye?
5 Thou hypocrite, first cast out the beam out of thine own eye; and then shalt thou see clearly to cast out the mote out of thy brother's eye.

— Matthew 7:1–5 KJV (Matthew 7:1–5 other versions)

A modern English version is as follows:

1 Do not judge, so that you may not be judged.
2 For with the judgement you make you will be judged, and the measure you give will be the measure you get.
3 Why do you see the speck in your neighbour's eye, but do not notice the log in your own eye?
4 Or how can you say to your neighbour, "Let me take the speck out of your eye", while the log is in your own eye?
5 You hypocrite, first take the log out of your own eye, and then you will see clearly to take the speck out of your neighbour's eye.

— Matthew 7:1–5 New Revised Standard (Matthew 7:1–5 other versions)

In the King James Version, the first two verses use plural "ye" and "you", and the next three verses use the singular "thou", "thy" and "thine" to the individual. (Luke 6:41 was translated "thou" after using "ye" in Luke 6:37.)

== Interpretation ==
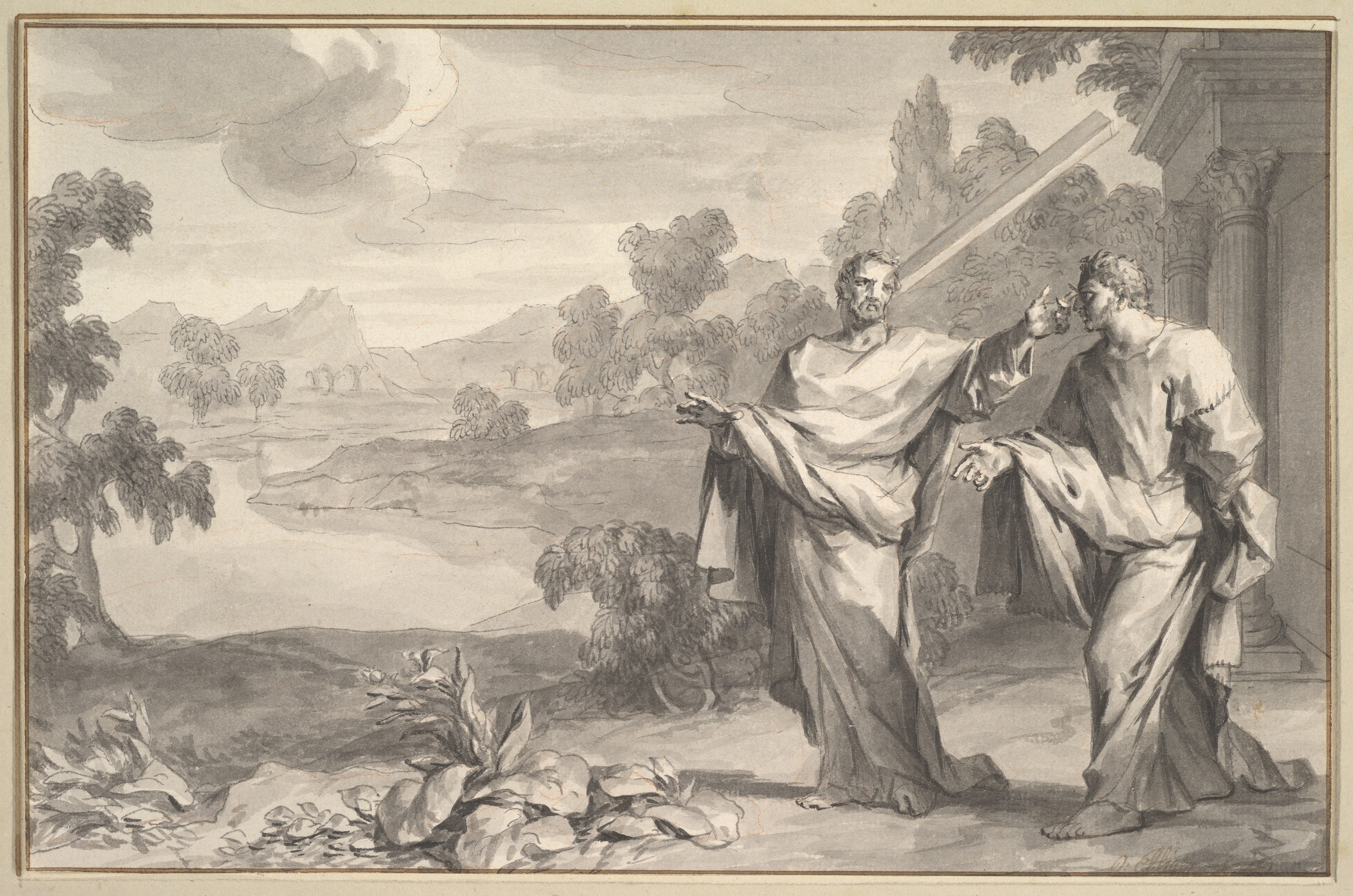
The Parable of the Mote and the Beam. Drawing by Ottmar Elliger the Younger (1666–1735).

The moral lesson is to avoid hypocrisy, self-righteousness, and censoriousness. The analogy used is of a small object in another's eye as compared with a large beam of wood in one's own. The original Greek word translated as "mote" (κάρφος karphos) meant "any small dry body". The terms mote and beam are from the King James Version; other translations use different words, e.g. the New International Version uses "speck (of sawdust)" and "plank". In 21st century English a "mote" is more normally a particle of dust – particularly one that is floating in the air – rather than a tiny splinter of wood.

In the analogy, the one seeking to remove the impediment in the eye of his brother has the larger impediment in his own eye, suggesting metaphorically that the one who attempts to regulate his brother often displays the greater blindness and hypocrisy.

A proverb of this sort was familiar to the Jews, and appears in numerous other cultures too, such as the Latin proverb of later Roman days referenced by Athenagoras of Athens, meretrix pudicam. (Note: Generally translated "The harlot rebuketh the chaste", the case-endings obviating the verb.)

== See also ==
- Jesus and the woman taken in adultery
- Physician, heal thyself
- The pot calling the kettle black
- Great Commandment

== Notes ==
The Mote and the Beam Life of Jesus: Sermon on the Mount or on the Plain
Preceded by The Birds of the Air in the Sermon on the Mount	New Testament; Events	Succeeded by Discourse on holiness in the Sermon on the Mount
