= Matthew 7:26 =

- ← 7:25 7:27 →
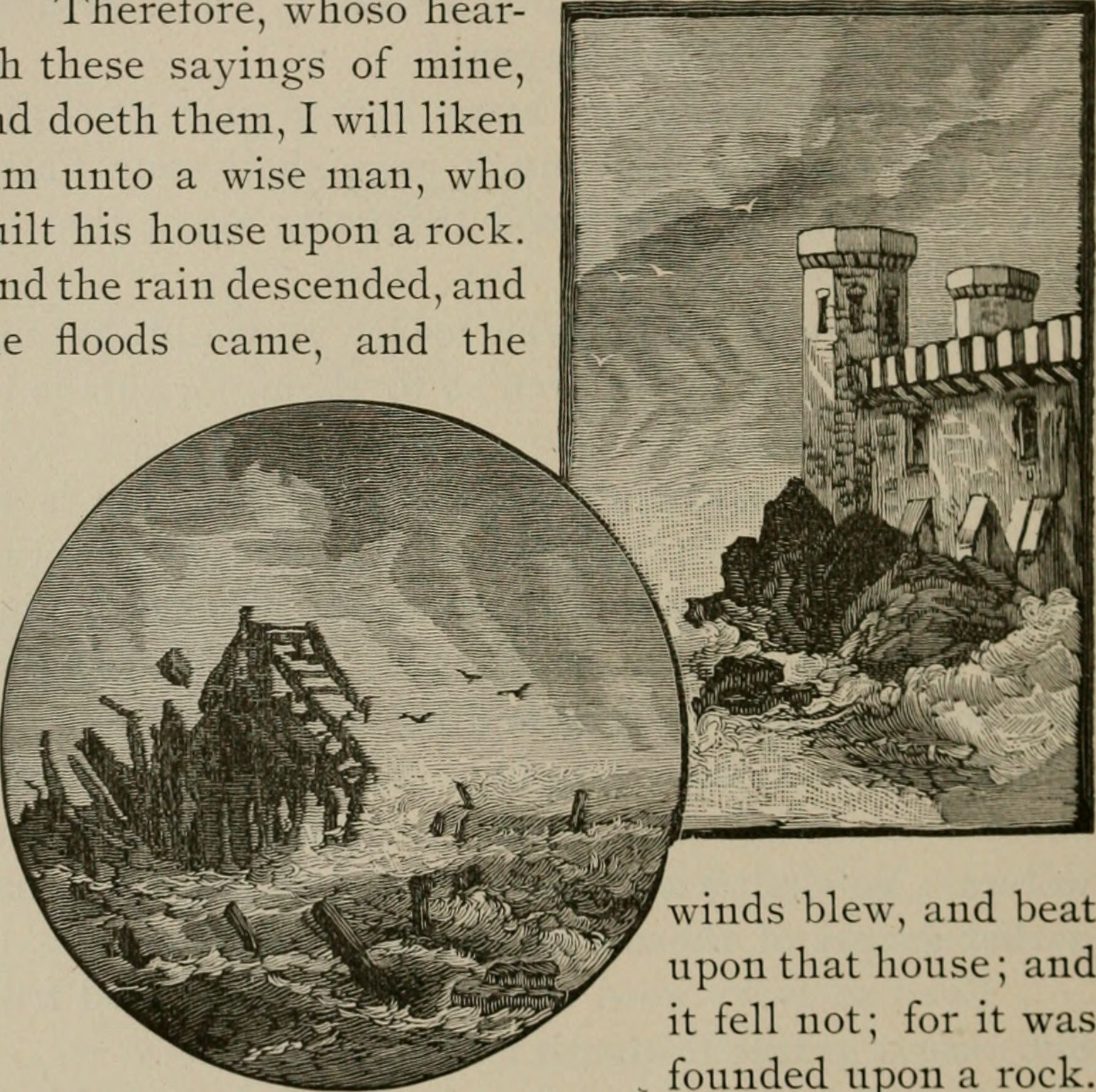
- Illustration in e: "The story of the Book of Mormon" (1888) by George Reynolds.
- Book: Gospel of Matthew
- Christian Bible part: New Testament

Matthew 7:26 is the twenty-sixth verse of the seventh chapter of the Gospel of Matthew in the New Testament and is part of the Sermon on the Mount. This verse continues the Parable of the Wise and the Foolish Builders.

== Content ==
In the original Greek according to Westcott-Hort this verse is:

και πας ο ακουων μου τους λογους τουτους και μη ποιων αυτους ομοιωθησεται
ανδρι μωρω οστις ωκοδομησεν αυτου την οικιαν επι την αμμον

In the King James Version of the Bible the text reads:

And every one that heareth these sayings of mine, and doeth them not,
shall be likened unto a foolish man, which built his house upon the sand:

The World English Bible translates the passage as:

Everyone who hears these words of mine, and doesn’t do them
will be like a foolish man, who built his house on the sand.

For a collection of other versions see BibleHub Matthew 7:26.

== Analysis ==
In the previous verses Jesus tells the story of a wise man who builds his house on rock and sees it survive a storm. This verse compares him to a foolish one who builds on sand and has his home washed away. It makes explicit that the story is a metaphor for the danger to those who do not follow the teachings just given in the Sermon on the Mount.

This verse modifies the version found in Luke 6:49 it expands the verse so that its structure parallels 24. It also makes clear that hearing the words are not enough, but rewards only come to those who act upon them as well. This is a common theme in Matthew also found at Matthew 7:13 and 7:21. In Luke the bad house is one lacking a foundation. In Matthew it is a house built on sand, a more tangible metaphor. This verse is the source of the common metaphor of something being built on sand being temporary and vulnerable.

The change from how the house is built to where it is built also changes the metaphor. In John Chrysostom's commentary he notes that building a house on sand takes just as much work as building one on stone, both the wicked and the good must labour equally through life but only the good see any reward from it.

== Commentary from the Church Fathers ==
Pseudo-Chrysostom: He said not, I will account him that hears and does, as wise; but, He shall be likened to a wise man. He then that is likened is a man; but to whom is he likened? To Christ; but Christ is the wise man who has built His house, that is, the Church, upon a rock, that is, upon the strength of the faith. The foolish man is the Devil, who has built his house, that is, all the ungodly, upon the sand, that is, the insecurity of unbelief, or upon the carnal, who are called the sand on account of their barrenness; both because they do not cleave together, but are scattered through the diversity of their opinions, and because they are innumerable. The rain is the doctrine that waters a man, the clouds are those from which the rain falls. Some are raised by the Holy Spirit, as the Apostles and Prophets, and some by the spirit of the Devil, as are the heretics. The good winds are the spirits of the different virtues, or the Angels who work invisibly in the senses of men, and lead them to good. The bad winds are the unclean spirits. The good floods are the Evangelists and teachers of the people; the evil floods are men full of an unclean spirit, and overflowing with many words; such are philosophers and the other professors of worldly wisdom, out of whose belly come rivers of dead water. The Church then which Christ has founded, neither the rain of false doctrine shall sap, nor the blast of the Devil overturn, nor the rush of mighty floods remove. Nor does it contradict this, that certain of the Church do fall; for not all that are called Christians, are Christ's, but, The Lord knows them that are his. (2 Tim. 2:19.) But against that house that the Devil has built comes down the rain of true doctrine, the winds, that is, the graces of the Spirit, or the Angels; the floods, that is, the four Evangelists and the rest of the wise; and so the house falls, that is, the Gentile world, that Christ may rise; and the ruin of that house was great, its errors broken up, its falsehoods laid open, its idols throughout the whole world broken down. He then is like unto Christ, who hears Christ's words, and does them; for he builds on a rock, that is, upon Christ, who is all good, so that on whatsoever kind of good any one shall build, he may seem to have built upon Christ. But as the Church built by Christ cannot be thrown down, so any such Christian who has built himself upon Christ, no adversity can overthrow, according to that, Who shall separate us from the love of Christ? (Rom. 8:35.) Like to the Devil is he that hears the words of Christ, and does them not. For words that are heard, and are not done, are likened to sand, they are dispersed and shed abroad. For the sand signifies all evil, or even worldly goods. For as the Devil's house is overthrown, so such as are built upon the sand are destroyed and fall. And great is that ruin if he have suffered any thing to fail of the foundation of faith; but not if he have committed fornication, or homicide, because he has whence he may arise through penitence, as David.

Preceded by Matthew 7:25	Gospel of Matthew; Chapter 7	Succeeded by Matthew 7:27
