= Matthew 7:22 =

- ← 7:21 7:23 →
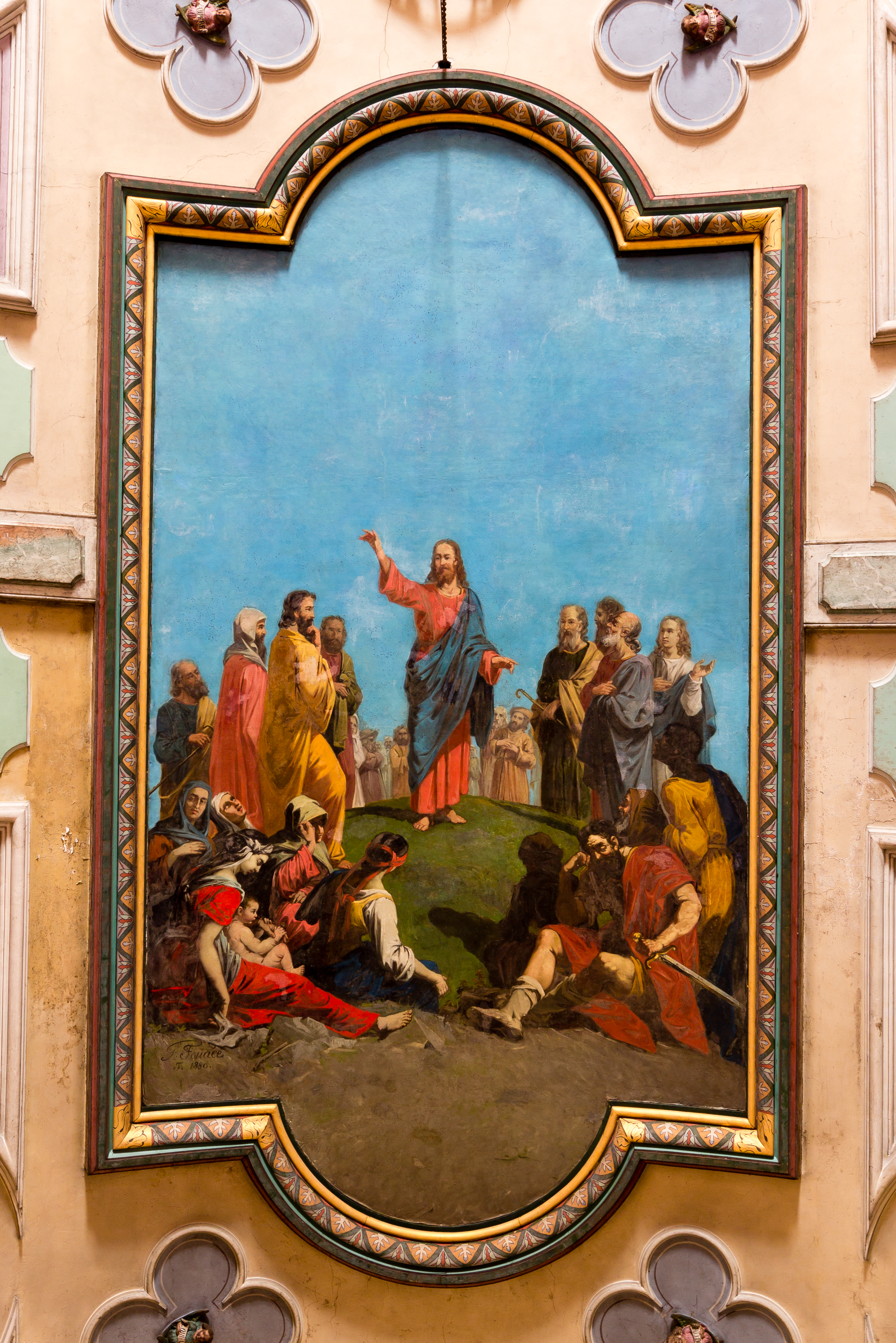
- "The Sermon on the Mount" by Guillaume Fouace (1878), Église Notre-Dame de Montfarville.
- Book: Gospel of Matthew
- Christian Bible part: New Testament

Matthew 7:22 is the twenty-second verse of the seventh chapter of the Gospel of Matthew in the New Testament and is part of the Sermon on the Mount. This verse continues Jesus' warning against false prophets.

== Content ==
In the King James Version of the Bible the text reads:

Many will say to me in that day, Lord, Lord, have we
not prophesied in thy name? and in thy name have cast
out devils? and in thy name done many wonderful works?

The World English Bible translates the passage as:

Many will tell me in that day, ‘Lord, Lord, didn’t
we prophesy in your name, in your name cast out
demons, and in your name do many mighty works?’

The Novum Testamentum Graece text is:

πολλοὶ ἐροῦσίν μοι ἐν ἐκείνῃ τῇ ἡμέρᾳ Κύριε Κύριε,
οὐ τῷ σῷ ὀνόματι ἐπροφητεύσαμεν, καὶ τῷ σῷ ὀνόματι δαιμόνια ἐξεβάλομεν,
καὶ τῷ σῷ ὀνόματι δυνάμεις πολλὰς ἐποιήσαμεν;

For a collection of other versions see BibleHub Matthew 7:22

== Analysis ==
In the previous verse Jesus mentioned that there would be those who had called him Lord (kyrie) who would not enter the Kingdom of Heaven. In this verse he notes that even some who have performed miracles in his name would also be excluded. The verse does not deny that these unholy may have made correct prophecies and driven out demons. These were acts that in that era were commonly attributed to teachers and mystics. Davies and Allison note that Jesus never calls upon his followers to perform such feats. Rather in the previous verses he calls for basic charity and piety. To Davies and Allison this verse is a special condemnation of mighty works, and emphasizes the importance of lesser works that might not bring fame to the practitioner. This verse has also been used as evidence by Protestants for the doctrine of justification by faith.

This is return to the theme of the parable of the narrow door of Matthew 7:13, with the word many emphasizing that there is a considerable number of individuals who claim special dispensation from Jesus, but who will not be admitted to the kingdom. Unlike the wolves in sheep's clothing at Matthew 7:15, these charismatics seem surprised to be condemned and to have believed themselves to be holy. The phrase "in that day" is a clear eschatological link to the Last Judgement. Here, Douglas claims that the phrasing of the verse makes it clear that the voice speaking is of those who have already been condemned and who are appealing to Jesus. This is evidence for the standard interpretation that in these verses God the Father is the ultimate judge, and Jesus plays a secondary role as an advocate or witness.

== Commentary from the Church Fathers ==
Augustine: Hereto it also pertains that we be not deceived by the name of Christ not only in such as bear the name and do not the deeds, but yet more by certain works and miracles, such as the Lord wrought because of the unbelieving, but yet warned us that we should not be deceived by such to suppose that there was invisible wisdom where was a visible miracle; wherefore He adds, saying, Many shall say to me in that day.

Chrysostom: See how He thus secretly brings in Himself. Here in the end of His Sermon He shows Himself as the Judge. The punishment that awaits sinners He had shown before, but now only reveals who He is that shall punish, saying, Many shall say to me in that day.

Pseudo-Chrysostom: When, namely, He shall come in the majesty of His Father; when none shall any more dare with strife of many words either to defend a lie, or to speak against the truth, when each man’s work shall speak, and his mouth be silent, when none shall come forward for another, but each shall fear for himself. For in that judgment the witnesses shall not be flattering men, but Angels speaking the truth, and the Judge is the righteous Lord; whence He closely images the cry of men fearful, and in straits, saying, Lord, Lord. For to call once is not enough for him who is under the necessity of terror.

Hilary of Poitiers: They even assure themselves of glory for their prophesying in teaching, for their casting out dæmons, for their mighty works; and hence promise themselves the kingdom of heaven, saying, Have we not prophesied in thy name?

Chrysostom: But there are that say that they spoke this falsely, and therefore were not saved. But they would not have dared to say this to the Judge in His presence. But the very answer and question prove that it was in His presence that they spoke thus. For having been here wondered at by all for the miracles which they wrought, and there seeing themselves punished, they say in wonderment, Lord, have we not prophesied in thy name? Others again say, that they did sinful deeds not while they thus were working miracles, but at a time later. But if this be so, that very thing which the Lord desired to prove would not be established, namely, that neither faith nor miracles avail ought where there is not a good life; as Paul also declares, If I have faith that I may remove mountains, but have not charity, I am nothing. (1 Cor. 13:2.)

Pseudo-Chrysostom: But note that He says, in my name, not in My Spirit; for they prophesy in the name of Christ, but with the spirit of the Devil; such are the diviners. But they may be known by this, that the Devil sometimes speaks falsely, the Holy Spirit never. Howbeit it is permitted to the Devil sometimes to speak the truth, that he may commend his lying by this his rare truth. Yet they cast out dæmons in the name of Christ, though they have the spirit of his enemy; or rather, they do not cast them out, but seem only to cast them out, the dæmons acting in concert with them. Also they do mighty works, that is, miracles, not such as are useful and necessary, but useless and fruitless.

Augustine: Read also what things the Magi did in Egypt in withstanding Moses.

Jerome: Otherwise; To prophesy, to work wonders, to cast out dæmons by divine power, is often not of his deserts who performs the works, but either the invocation of Christ’s name has this force; or it is suffered for the condemnation of those that invoke, or for the benefit of those that see and hear, that however they despise the men who work the wonders, they may give honour to God. So Saul and Balaam and Caiaphas prophesied; the sons of Seæva in the Acts of the Apostles were seen to cast out dæmons; and Judas with the soul of a traitor is related to have wrought many signs among the other Apostles.

Chrysostom: For all are not alike fit for all things; these are of pure life, but have not so great faith; those again have the reverse. Therefore God converted these by the means of those to the showing forth much faith; and those that had faith He called by this unspeakable gift of miracles to a better life; and to that end gave them this grace in great richness. And they say, We have done many mighty works. But because they were ungrateful towards those who thus honoured them, it follows rightly, Then will I confess unto you, I never knew you.

Jerome: Emphatically, Then will I confess, for long time He had forebore to say it.

Preceded by Matthew 7:21	Gospel of Matthew; Chapter 7	Succeeded by Matthew 7:23
