= Matthew 7:23 =

- ← 7:22 7:24 →
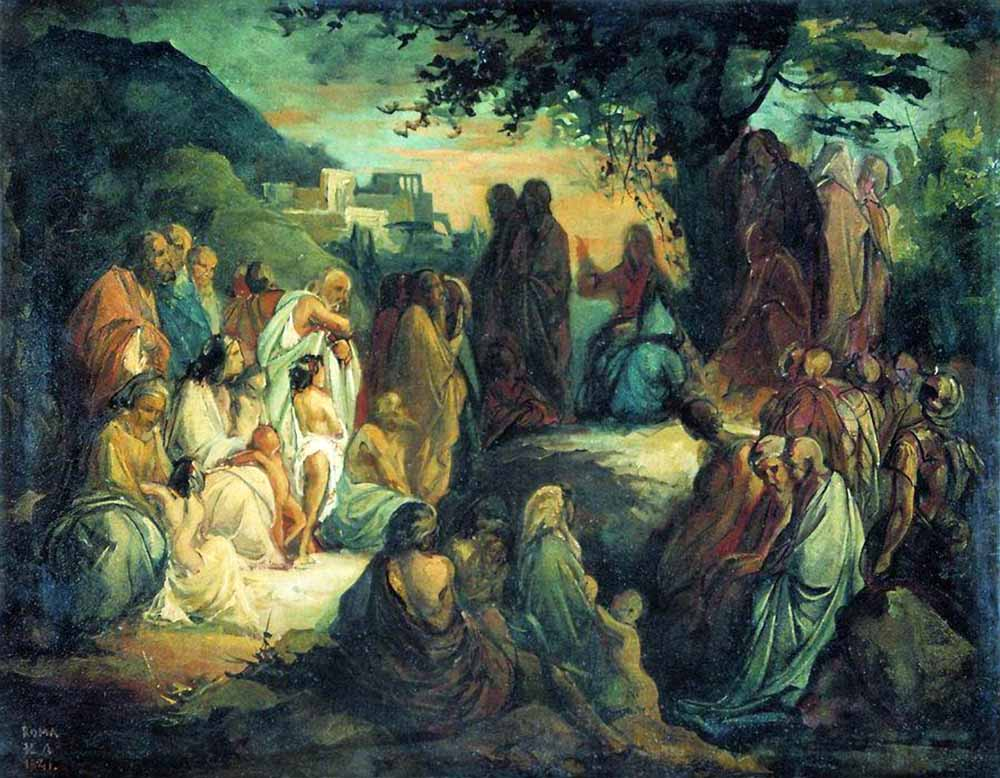
- "The Sermon on the Mount" by Nikolay Lomtev (1816–1858), before 1858.
- Book: Gospel of Matthew
- Christian Bible part: New Testament

Matthew 7:23 is the twenty-third verse of the seventh chapter of the Gospel of Matthew in the New Testament and is part of the Sermon on the Mount. This verse continues Jesus' warning against false prophets.

== Content ==
In the King James Version of the Bible the text reads:

And then will I profess unto them, I never
knew you: depart from me, ye that work iniquity.

The World English Bible translates the passage as:

Then I will tell them, 'I never knew
you. Depart from me, you who work iniquity.'

The Novum Testamentum Graece text is:

καὶ τότε ὁμολογήσω αὐτοῖς ὅτι Οὐδέποτε ἔγνων ὑμᾶς
ἀποχωρεῖτε ἀπ’ ἐμοῦ οἱ ἐργαζόμενοι τὴν ἀνομίαν.

The New Living Translation reads:

But I will reply, ‘I never knew you. Get away from me, you who break God’s laws.’

For a collection of other versions see BibleHub Matthew 7:23

== Analysis ==
The previous verse featured charismatic miracle workers appealing to Jesus at the Last Judgment after being condemned even after performing miraculous acts. This verse is Jesus' response.

This verse gives evidence for what the author of Matthew believed Jesus' role would be at the Last Judgment, an important Christological question. Hare believes that the wording makes clear that Jesus is not the judge, but is rather a witness or advocate before God. Jesus does not use the language of a judge. The word translated as profess/tell is a specific legal term that was used by a witness in a court of law while making a statement. France and Schweizer disagree, and believe that in these verses Jesus is presenting himself as the judge at the Last Judgment.

The final part of the verse is a reference to Psalm 6:8. It is also rooted in Jewish legal traditions. "Depart from me" is a phrase of renunciation to be used against those who have been expelled from the community. "You mean nothing to me" was an equivalent, if stronger, possible phrase. The phrase translated as "you who work iniquity," literally means "you who break the law." Alternative translations are evildoers or lawbreakers. There is debate amongst scholars over whether this is a specific reference to the Law of Moses. Christian churches have long rejected the need to follow the Mosaic codes, but some scholars believe that the author of Matthew did believe that they needed to be obeyed.

== Commentary from the Church Fathers ==
Pseudo-Chrysostom: For great wrath ought to be preceded by great forbearance, that the sentence of God may be made more just, and the death of the sinners more merited. God does not know sinners because they are not worthy that they should be known of God; not that He altogether is ignorant concerning them, but because He knows them not for His own. For God knows all men according to nature, but He seems not to know them for that He loves them not, as they seem not to know God who do not serve Him worthily.

Chrysostom: He says to them, I never knew you, as it were, not at the day of judgment only, but not even then when ye were working miracles. For there are many whom He has now in abhorrence, and yet turns away His wrath before their punishment.

Jerome: Note that He says, I never knew you, as being against some that say that all men have always been among rational creatures.

Gregory the Great: By this sentence it is given to us to learn, that among men charity and humility, and not mighty works, are to be esteemed. Whence also now the Holy Church, if there be any miracles of heretics, despises them, because she knows that they have not the mark of holiness. And the proof of holiness is not to work miracles, but to love our neighbour as ourselves, to think truly of God, and of our neighbour better than of ourselves.

Augustine: But never let it be said as the Manichees say, that the Lord spoke these things concerning the holy Prophets; He spoke of those who after the preaching of His Gospel seem to themselves to speak in His name not knowing what they speak.

Hilary of Poitiers: But thus the hypocrites boasted, as though they spoke somewhat of themselves, and as though the power of God did not work all these things, being invoked; but reading has brought them the knowledge of His doctrine, and the name of Christ casts out the dæmons. Out of our own selves then is that blessed eternity to be earned, and out of ourselves must be put forth something that we may will that which is good, that we may avoid all evil, and may rather do what He would have us do, than boast of that to which He enables us.

Then he disowns and banishes them for their evil works, saying, Depart from me, ye that work iniquity.

Jerome: He says not, Who have worked, but, who work iniquity, that He should not seem to take away repentance. Ye, that is, who up to the present hour when the judgment is come, though ye have not the opportunity, yet retain the desire of sinning.

Pseudo-Chrysostom: For death separates the soul from the body, but changes not the purpose of the heart.

Preceded by Matthew 7:22	Gospel of Matthew; Chapter 7	Succeeded by Matthew 7:24
