= Matthew 7:15 =

- ← 7:14 7:16 →
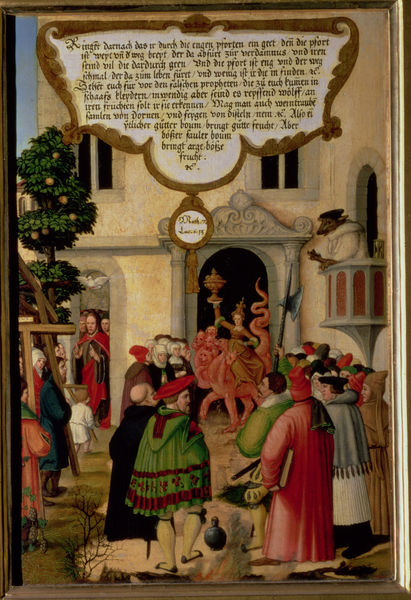
- Illustration of Christ's teaching in Matthew 7:15, "Beware of false prophets", a section of wing panel from the Mompelgarter Altarpiece.
- Book: Gospel of Matthew
- Christian Bible part: New Testament

Matthew 7:15 is the fifteenth verse of the seventh chapter of the Gospel of Matthew in the New Testament and is part of the Sermon on the Mount. This verse begins the section warning against false prophets.

== Content ==
In the King James Version of the Bible the text reads:

Beware of false prophets, which come to you in sheep's
clothing, but inwardly they are ravening wolves.

The World English Bible translates the passage as:

Beware of false prophets, who come to you in
sheep’s clothing, but inwardly are ravening wolves.

The Novum Testamentum Graece text is:

Προσέχετε ἀπὸ τῶν ψευδοπροφητῶν, οἵτινες ἔρχονται πρὸς ὑμᾶς
ἐν ἐνδύμασιν προβάτων ἔσωθεν δέ εἰσιν λύκοι ἅρπαγες.

== The metaphor ==
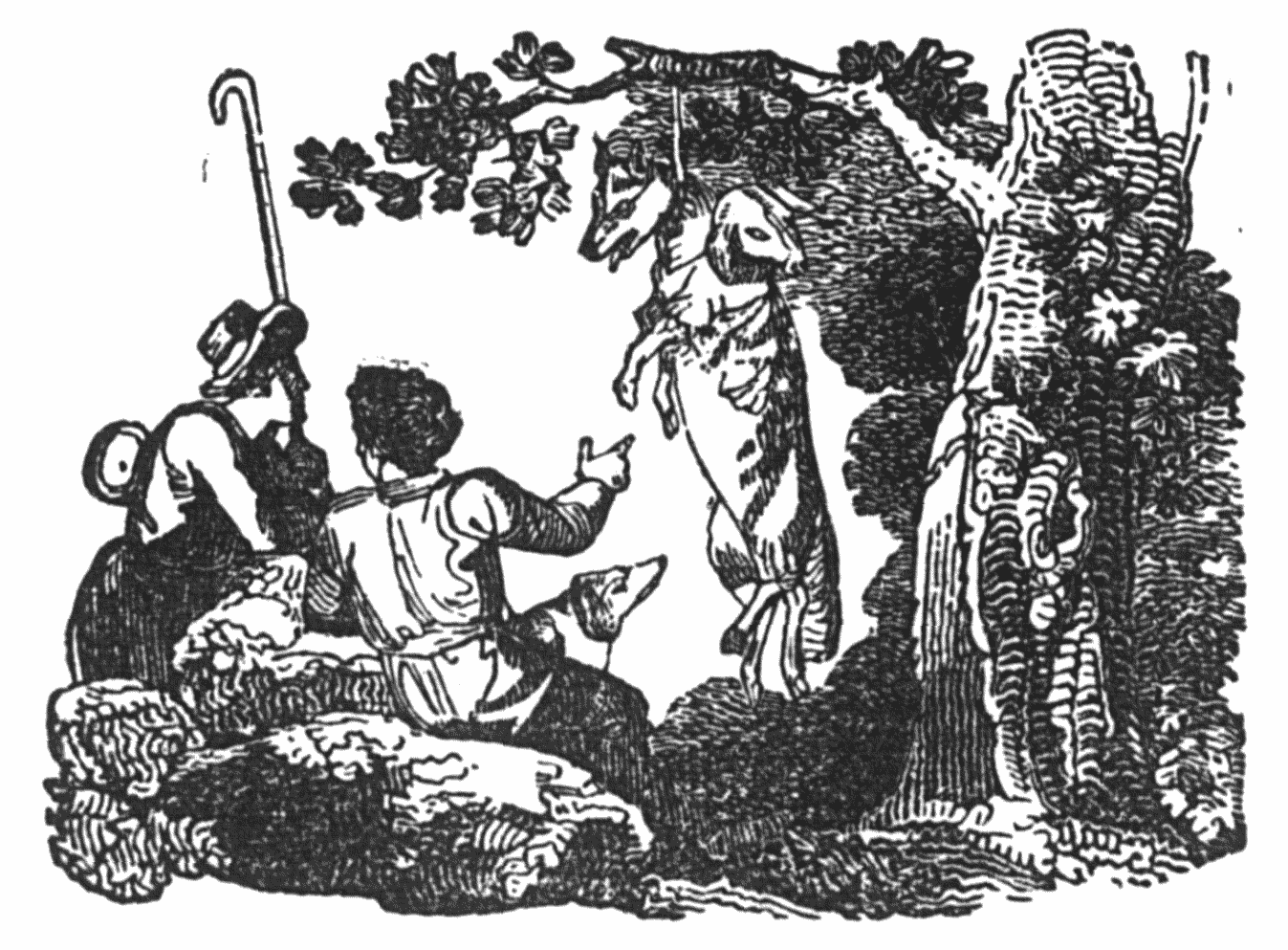
A hanged wolf in sheep's clothing. A 19th century illustration of the mediaeval fable attributed to Aesop

False prophets are frequently referred to in the New Testament, sheep were an important part of life in the Galilee of Jesus' era, and the metaphor of the pious as a flock of sheep is a common one in both the Old and New Testaments. Wolves were regarded as greedy and malevolent predators who were a threat to the innocent, and such wolf metaphors are also found in several other parts of the Bible. Schweizer feels this metaphor may be linked to the traditional description of the prophets being clad in skins.

It is an open question who, if anyone, this verse is directed against. At the time the gospel was written the Christian communities had several opponents, who may be being targeted by the author of Matthew in this verse. Davies and Allison note several groups that scholars have proposed. There are several false prophets mentioned in the literature of the period such as Simon Magus and Bar Kokhba, but the text has no hint that it referring to one of these in particular. France notes that the wording refers to the prophets coming to you implies that these prophets are from outside the community of disciples. The Pharisees are the primary opponent of the righteous through the Gospel of Matthew, and this could be another attack on them. However, Matthew 7:22 seems to make clear that the false prophets are Christian, rather than Jewish. This also could rule out other Jewish sects active in this period such as the Essenes and Zealots. While in later years Christian groups such as the Gnostics would become prominent rivals to mainstream Christianity, Gnosticism was not yet a major concern at the time this Gospel was written. Scholars who see a rivalry between the Jewish Christianity of Matthew and the wider gospel of St. Paul have read this verse as an attack on Pauline Christianity. Schweizer supports the notion that the idea of false prophets is closely attached to eschatology, and that this passage refers to events expected to occur in the end times, not to any current rivals. False prophets were a frequent concern in the Old Testament, such as in Jeremiah. France believes that even without any current threats the history in the Old Testament would lead Jesus to be concerned about the dangers of false prophets. The figures in Matthew 7:21-22 are themselves surprised to be judged harshly, but the word inwardly makes clear that prophets in this verse are knowing deceivers of the faithful.

Additionally, some Christians interpret this passage as referring to not a single false prophet, but any false teachers within the Christian church who preach against the Gospel.

The metaphor of 'a wolf in sheep's clothing' has become a common English expression. It is alluded to in Romeo and Juliet, where a character is called a "wolvish ravening lamb." See The Wolf in Sheep's Clothing for some other cultural uses of the phrase.

== Commentary from Church Fathers ==
Pseudo-Chrysostom: The Lord had before commanded His Apostles, that they should not do their alms, prayers, and fastings before men, as the hypocrites; and that they might know that all these things may be done in hypocrisy, He speaks saying, Take heed of false prophets.

Augustine: When the Lord had said that there were few that find the strait gate and narrow way, that heretics, who often commend themselves because of the smallness of their numbers, might not here intrude themselves, He straightway subjoins, Take heed of false prophets.

Chrysostom: Having taught that the gate is strait, because there are many that pervert the way that leads to it, He proceeds, Take heed of false prophets. In the which that they might be the more careful, He reminds them of the things that were done among their fathers, calling them false prophets; for even in that day the like things fell out.

Pseudo-Chrysostom: What is written below that the Law and the Prophets were until John, (Mat. 11:13.) is said, because there should be no prophecy concerning Christ after He was come. Prophets indeed there have been and are, but not prophesying of Christ, rather interpreting the things which had been prophesied of Christ by the ancients, that is by the doctors of the Churches. For no man can unfold prophetic meaning, but the Spirit of prophecy. The Lord then knowing that there should be false teachers, warns them of divers heresies, saying, Take heed of false prophets. And forasmuch as they would not be manifest Gentiles, but lurk under the Christian name, He said not ‘See ye,’ but, Take heed. For a thing that is certain is simply seen, or looked upon; but when it is uncertain it is watched or narrowly considered. Also He says Take heed, because it is a sure precaution of security to know him whom you avoid. But this form of warning, Take heed, does not imply that the Devil will introduce heresies against God's will, but by His permission only; but because He would not choose servants without trial, therefore He sends them temptation; and because He would not have them perish through ignorance, He therefore warns them beforehand. Also that no heretical teacher might maintain that He spoke here of Gentile and Jewish teachers and not of them, He adds, who come to yon in sheep's clothing. Christians are called sheep, and the sheep's clothing is a form of Christianity and of feigned religion. And nothing so casts out all good as hypocrisy; for evil that puts on the semblance of good, cannot be provided against, because it is unknown. Again, that the heretic might not allege that He here speaks of the true teachers which were yet sinners, He adds, But inwardly they are ravening wolves. But Catholic teachers should they indeed have been sinners, are spoken of as servants of the flesh, yet not as ravening wolves, because it is not their purpose to destroy Christians. Clearly then it is of heretical teachers that He speaks; for they put on the guise of Christians, to the end they may tear in pieces the Christian with the wicked fangs of seduction. Concerning, such the Apostle speaks, I know that after my departure there will enter among you grievous wolves, not sparing the flock. (Acts 20:29.)

== Uses ==
- This verse is quoted in the chapter 26 of Didascalia Apostolorum, an ancient Christian teaching book from 230 AD.

== See also ==
- Wolf in sheep's clothing

Preceded by Matthew 7:14	Gospel of Matthew; Chapter 7	Succeeded by Matthew 7:16
