= Matthew 7:17–18 =

- ← 7:16 7:19 →
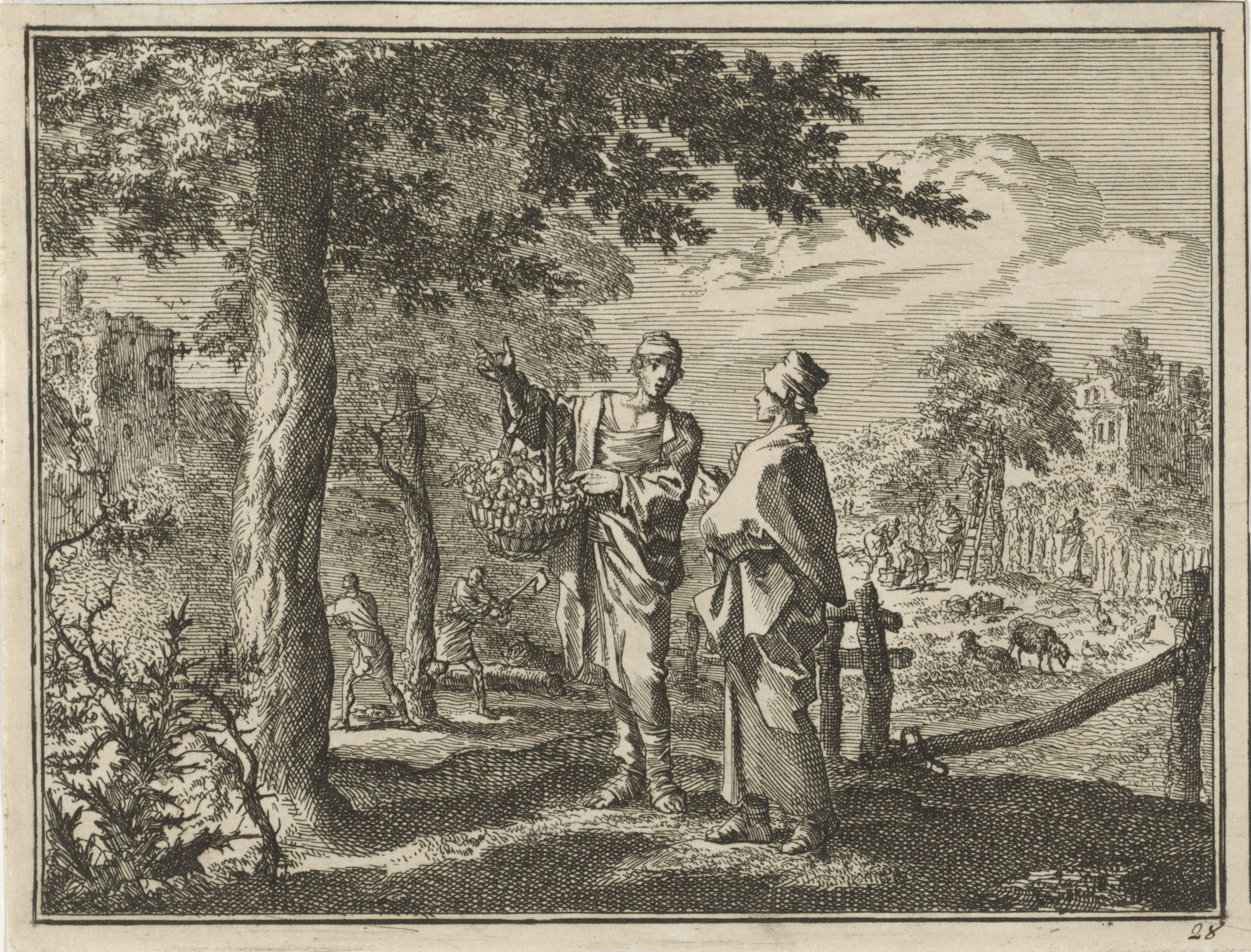
- Illustration to Matthew 7:17–18: Good tree bears good fruit; corrupt tree bears evil fruit. Jan Luyken (1712).
- Book: Gospel of Matthew
- Christian Bible part: New Testament

Matthew 7:17 and Matthew 7:18 are the seventeenth and eighteenth verses of the seventh chapter of the Gospel of Matthew in the New Testament and is part of the Sermon on the Mount. These verses continue the section warning against false prophets.

== Content ==
In the King James Version of the Bible the text reads:

17 Even so every good tree bringeth forth good
fruit; but a corrupt tree bringeth forth evil fruit.
18 A good tree cannot bring forth evil fruit, neither
can a corrupt tree bring forth good fruit.

The World English Bible translates the passage as:

17 Even so, every good tree produces good fruit;
but the corrupt tree produces evil fruit.
18 A good tree can’t produce evil fruit, neither
can a corrupt tree produce good fruit.

The Novum Testamentum Graece text is:

17 οὕτως πᾶν δένδρον ἀγαθὸν καρποὺς καλοὺς ποιεῖ,
τὸ δὲ σαπρὸν δένδρον καρποὺς πονηροὺς ποιεῖ
18 οὐ δύναται δένδρον ἀγαθὸν καρποὺς πονηροὺς ἐνεγκεῖν,
οὐδὲ δένδρον σαπρὸν καρποὺς καλοὺς ἐνεγκεῖν.

For a collection of other versions see BibleHub Matthew 7:17-18

== Analysis ==
These two verses closely match each other. Hill notes that the structure here is a classic Semitic way of emphasizing a point: first a statement is said positively and then repeated negatively. The first half of the statement is taken directly from John the Baptist words at Matthew 3:10.

Schweitzer notes how fundamental the call for change is in this verse. Piety does not mean just changing exterior fruits, but rather a radical conversion from one type of being to another. It is, adds Schweitzer, “a transformed heart producing a transformed life”.

== Commentary from the Church Fathers ==
Augustine: These men of whom we have spoken are offended with these two natures, not considering them according to their true usefulness; whereas it is not by our advantage or disadvantage, but in itself considered, that nature gives glory to her Framer. All natures then that are, because they are, have their own manner, their own appearance, and as it were their own harmony, and are altogether good.

Chrysostom: But that none should say, An evil tree brings forth indeed evil fruit, but it brings forth also good, and so it becomes hard to discern, as it has a two-fold produce; on this account He adds, A good tree cannot bring forth evil fruit, neither can an evil tree bring forth good fruit.

Augustine: From this speech the Manichees suppose that neither can a soul that is evil be possibly changed for better, nor one that is good into worse. As though it had been, A good tree cannot become bad, nor a bad tree become good; whereas it is thus said, A good tree cannot bring forth evil fruit, nor the reverse. The tree is the soul, that is, the man himself; the fruit is the man's works. An evil man therefore cannot work good works, nor a good man evil works. Therefore, if an evil man would work good things, let him first become good. But as long as he continues evil, he cannot bring forth good fruits. Like as it is indeed possible that what was once snow, should cease to be so; but it cannot be that snow should be warm; so it is possible that he who has been evil should be so no longer; but it is impossible that an evil man should do good. For though he may sometimes be useful, it is not he that does it, but it comes of Divine Providence superintending.

Rabanus Maurus: And man is denominated a good tree, or a bad, after his will, as it is good or bad. His fruit is his works, which can neither be good when the will is evil, nor evil when it is good.

Augustine: But as it is manifest that all evil works proceed from an evil will, as its fruits from an evil tree; so of this evil will itself whence will you say that it has sprung, except that the evil will of an angel sprung from an angel, of man from man? And what were these two before those evils arose in them, but the good work of God, a good and praiseworthy nature. See then out of good arises evil; nor was there any thing at all out of which it might arise but what was good. I mean the evil will itself, since there was no evil before it, no evil works, which could not come but from evil will as fruit from an evil tree. Nor can it be said that it sprung out of good in this way, because it was made good by a good God; for it was made of nothing, and not of God.

Jerome: We would ask those heretics who affirm that there are two natures directly opposed to each other, if they admit that a good tree cannot bring forth evil fruit, how it was possible for Moses, a good tree, to sin as he did at the water of contradiction? Or for Peter to deny his Lord in the Passion, saying, I know not the man? Or how, on the other hand, could Moses’ father-in-law, an evil tree, inasmuch as he believed not in the God of Israel, give good counsel?

Preceded by Matthew 7:16	Gospel of Matthew; Chapter 7	Succeeded by Matthew 7:19
