= Matthew 7 =

- ← chapter 6 chapter 8 →
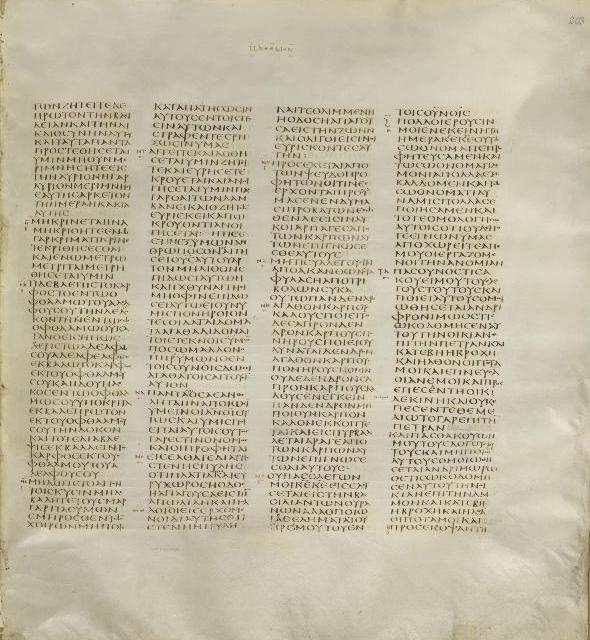
- Matthew 6:32–7:27 on Codex Sinaiticus (AD 330–360)
- Book: Gospel of Matthew
- Category: Gospel
- Christian Bible part: New Testament
- Order in the Christian part: 1

Matthew 7 is the seventh chapter of the Gospel of Matthew in the New Testament. This chapter is the last of the three chapters which comprise the Sermon on the Mount.

== Text ==
The original text was written in Koine Greek. This chapter is divided into 29 verses.

=== Textual witnesses ===
Some early manuscripts containing the text of this chapter are: (Note: The extant Codex Alexandrinus and Codex Bezae do not contain this chapter due to lacunae.)

- Codex Vaticanus (~325–350; complete)
- Codex Sinaiticus (~330–360; complete)
- Codex Washingtonianus (~400)
- Codex Ephraemi Rescriptus (~450; extant verses 6–29)

== Verses ==
- Matthew 7:1
- Matthew 7:2
- Matthew 7:3
- Matthew 7:4
- Matthew 7:5
- Matthew 7:6
- Matthew 7:7
- Matthew 7:8
- Matthew 7:9
- Matthew 7:10
- Matthew 7:11
- Matthew 7:12
- Matthew 7:13
- Matthew 7:14
- Matthew 7:15
- Matthew 7:16
- Matthew 7:17
- Matthew 7:18
- Matthew 7:19
- Matthew 7:20
- Matthew 7:21
- Matthew 7:22
- Matthew 7:23
- Matthew 7:24
- Matthew 7:25
- Matthew 7:26
- Matthew 7:27
- Matthew 7:28
- Matthew 7:29

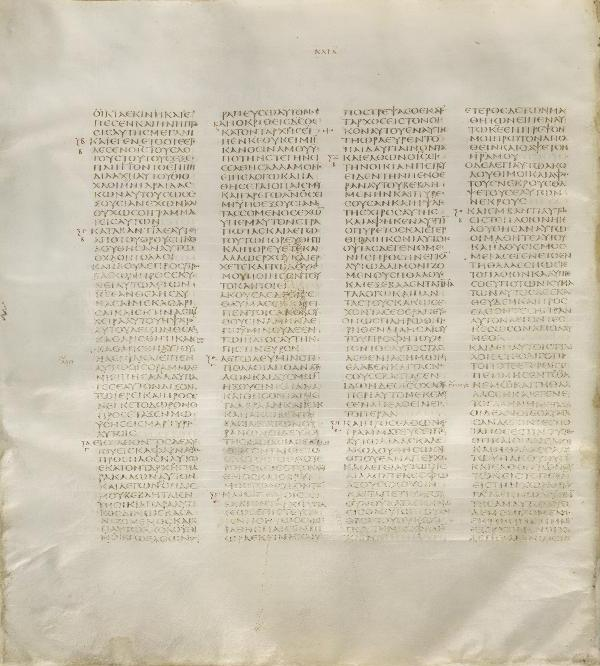
Codex Sinaiticus (AD 330–360), Matthew 7:27–8:28

== Analysis ==
In John Wesley's analysis of the Sermon on the Mount, chapter five outlines "the sum of all true religion", allowing chapter six to detail "rules for that right intention which we are to preserve in all our outward actions, unmixed with worldly desires or anxious cares for even the necessaries of life" and this chapter to provide "cautions against the main hinderances of religion". Within the chapter there are several themes, with verses 1–12 dealing with judging and discernment. Verses 3–5 relate a proverbial saying on the Mote and the Beam, which has a parallel in Luke 6:37–42. At Matthew 7:7 Jesus returns to the subject of prayer, promising that God will respond to prayer. Verses 7:13 and 14 contain the analogy of the broad and narrow roads, a warning of the ease of slipping into damnation. Verse 7:15 continues the warnings about judgment and adds a caution about false prophets by repeating some of the language used by John the Baptist in chapter 3.

The chapter ends with the parable of the wise and the foolish builders in Matthew 7:24–27, which has a parallel in Luke 6:46–49.

According to theologian Edward Plumptre, in comparison with the preceding chapters, "this [chapter] deals chiefly with the temptations incident to the more advanced stages of [Christian] life when lower forms of evil have been overcome – with the temper that judges others, the self-deceit of unconscious hypocrisy, the danger of unreality".
