= Matthew 7:27 =

- ← 7:26 7:28 →
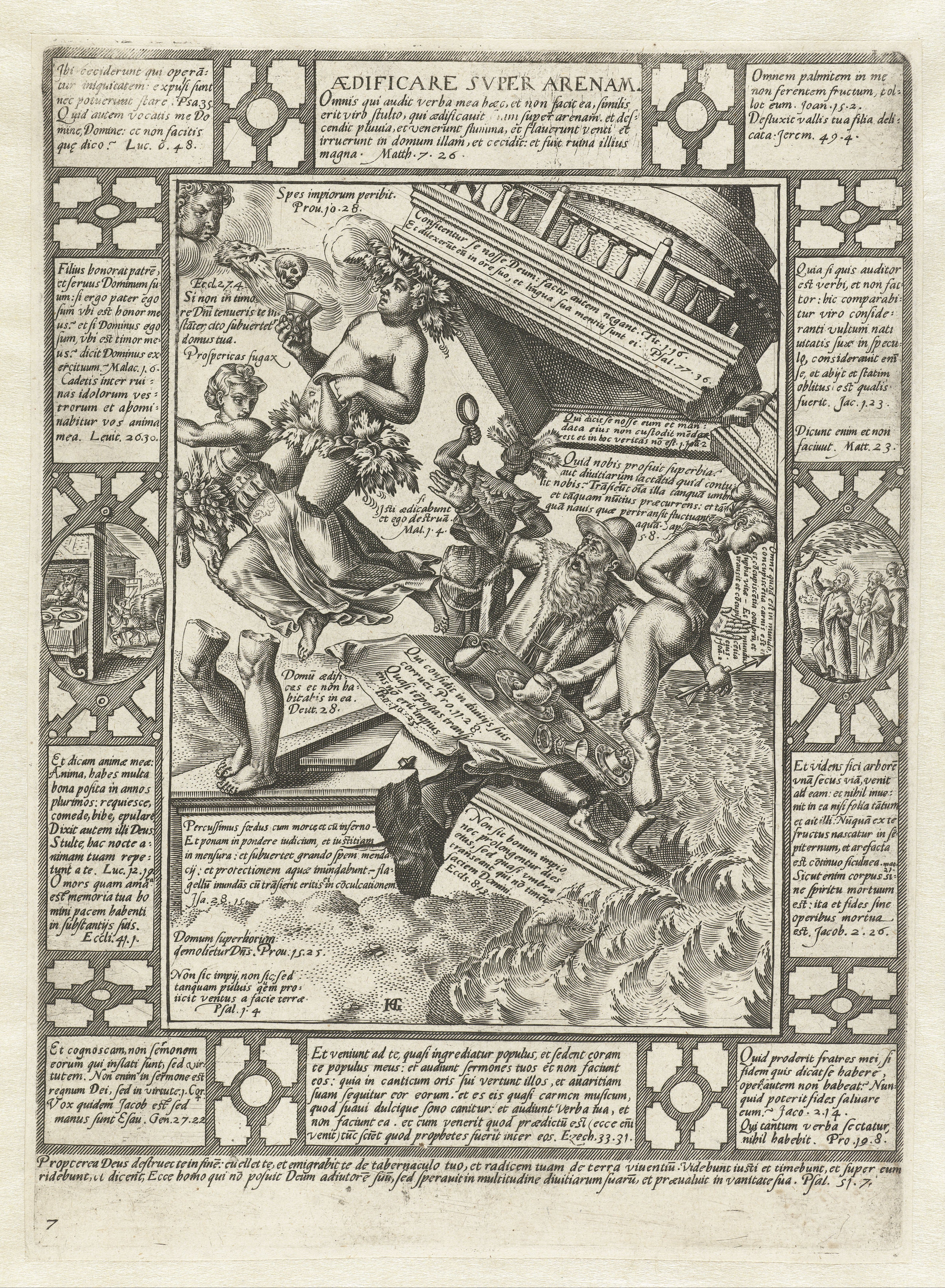
- Illustration to Matthew 7:24–27: A house built upon the sand. Hendrick Goltzius (1598 - 1604).
- Book: Gospel of Matthew
- Christian Bible part: New Testament

Matthew 7:27 is the twenty-seventh verse of the seventh chapter of the Gospel of Matthew in the New Testament. This verse finishes the Parable of the Wise and the Foolish Builders and is the closing verse of the Sermon on the Mount.

== Content ==
In the original Greek according to Westcott-Hort this verse is:

και κατεβη η βροχη και ηλθον οι ποταμοι και επνευσαν οι ανεμοι και
προσεκοψαν τη οικια εκεινη και επεσεν και ην η πτωσις αυτης μεγαλη

In the King James Version of the Bible the text reads:

And the rain descended, and the floods came, and the winds blew, and
beat upon that house; and it fell: and great was the fall of it.

The World English Bible translates the passage as:

"The rain came down, the floods came, and the winds blew, and
beat on that house; and it fell—and great was its fall."

For a collection of other versions see BibleHub Matthew 7:27.

== Analysis ==
The start of this verse is a repetition of Matthew 7:25, but in that verse the house built on rock didn't fall. There is also a slight change from the rain beating on the house to the rain beating against it. Matthew, unlike Luke's version does not give a reason for the house to fall, rather the reason is given for why the house built on stone survives. "Great was its fall" may well have been a proverbial term for complete destruction.

This warning of doom and destruction is the final line of Jesus' Sermon on the Mount. To Augustine it is "fear-inspiring"

Preceded by Matthew 7:26	Gospel of Matthew; Chapter 7	Succeeded by Matthew 7:28
