= 7:14 =

7:14 is a set of numbers that may refer to several popular biblical passages:

- Isaiah 7:14
- Matthew 7:14

== See also ==
- 3:16
