= Matthew 7:19–20 =

- ← 7:18 7:21 →
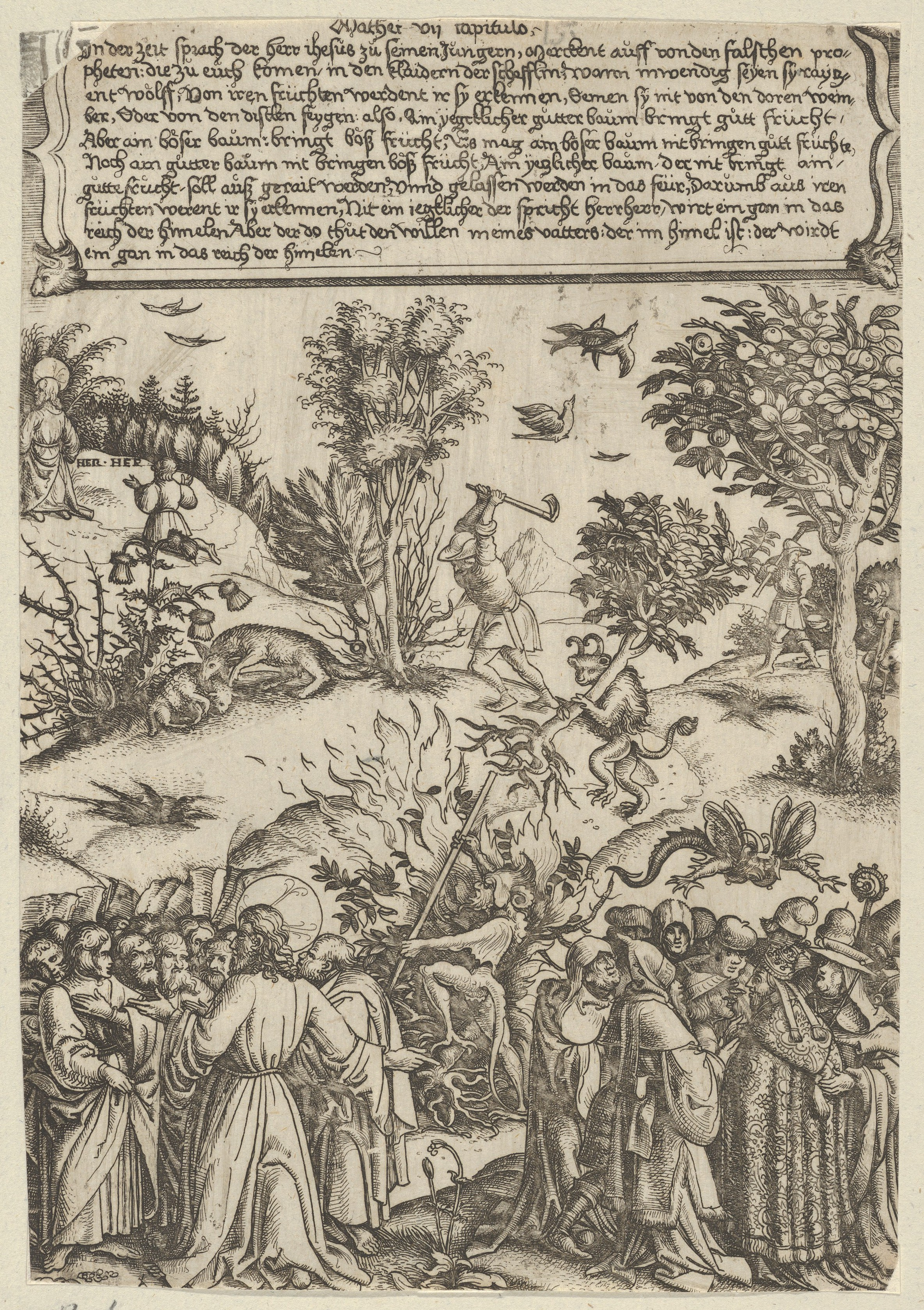
- Daniel Hopfer's "Christ Denouncing False Prophets and Pharisees": Illustration to Matthew 7:15-21
- Book: Gospel of Matthew
- Christian Bible part: New Testament

Matthew 7:19 and Matthew 7:20 are the nineteenth and twentieth verses of the seventh chapter of the Gospel of Matthew in the New Testament and are part of the Sermon on the Mount. The verses continue the section warning against false prophets.

== Content ==
In the King James Version of the Bible the text reads:

19 Every tree that bringeth not forth good
fruit is hewn down, and cast into the fire.
20 Wherefore by their fruits ye shall know them.

The World English Bible translates the passage as:

19 Every tree that doesn’t grow good fruit
is cut down, and thrown into the fire.
20 Therefore by their fruits you will know them.

The Novum Testamentum Graece text is:

19 πᾶν δένδρον μὴ ποιοῦν καρπὸν καλὸν
ἐκκόπτεται καὶ εἰς πῦρ βάλλεται
20 ἄραγε ἀπὸ τῶν καρπῶν αὐτῶν ἐπιγνώσεσθε αὐτούς.

For a collection of other versions see BibleHub Matthew 7:19-20.

== Analysis ==
In the previous verses Jesus has begun a metaphor describing false prophets as trees that produce bad fruit. In this verse he tells what happens to such trees. The language in this passage is borrowed from that used by John the Baptist in Chapter 3, and its use here creates clear parallels between Jesus and John. The second part of verse 19 is worded almost identically to Matthew 3:10, with only a slight grammatical change as it is no longer following the axe metaphor. Harrington notes that this verse does not appear in this section of Luke. Harrington thus believes that the author of Matthew appended the words of the Baptist to material found in Q to make the warning more eschatological.

The mention of fire is a clear reference to Gehenna, which has been twice already mentioned in the Sermon on the Mount at Matthew 5:22 and 5:29. Davies and Allison note that the reference to fire is metaphorical rather than literal. At other parts of the gospel, such as Matthew 8:12, the ultimate punishment is darkness.

Schweizer notes the use of the word "every" and how it emphasizes the universal nature of God's examination. Verse 19 is one of the harshest statements by Jesus. To Bruner it serves as a reminder that there is a sternness to Jesus' message that believers should not ignore. To France this is a warning that even some of those who claim to be disciples will be punished at the Last Judgment.

== Commentary from the Church Fathers ==
Chrysostom: He had not enjoined them to punish the false prophets, and therefore shows them the terrors of that punishment that is of God, saying, Every tree that bringeth not forth good fruit shall be hewn down, and cast into the fire. In these words He seems to aim also at the Jews, and thus calls to mind the word of John the Baptist, denouncing punishment against them in the very same words. For he had thus spoken to the Jews, warning them of the axe impending, the tree that should be cut down, and the fire that could not be extinguished. But if one will examine somewhat closely, here are two punishments, to be cut down, and to be burned; and he that is burned is also altogether cut out of the kingdom; which is the harder punishment. Many indeed fear no more than hell; but I say that the fall of that glory is a far more bitter punishment, than the pains of hell itself. For what evil great or small would not a father undergo, that he might see and enjoy a most dear son? Let us then think the same of that glory; for there is no son so dear to his father as is the rest of the good, to be deceased and to be with Christ. The pain of hell is indeed intolerable, yet are ten thousand hells nothing to falling from that blessed glory, and being held in hate by Christ.

Glossa Ordinaria: From the foregoing similitude He draws the conclusion to what He had said before, as being now manifest, saying, Therefore by their fruits ye shall know them.

| Preceded by Matthew 7:18 | Gospel of Matthew; Chapter 7 | Succeeded by Matthew 7:21 |
