= Matthew 7:16 =

- ← 7:15 7:17 →
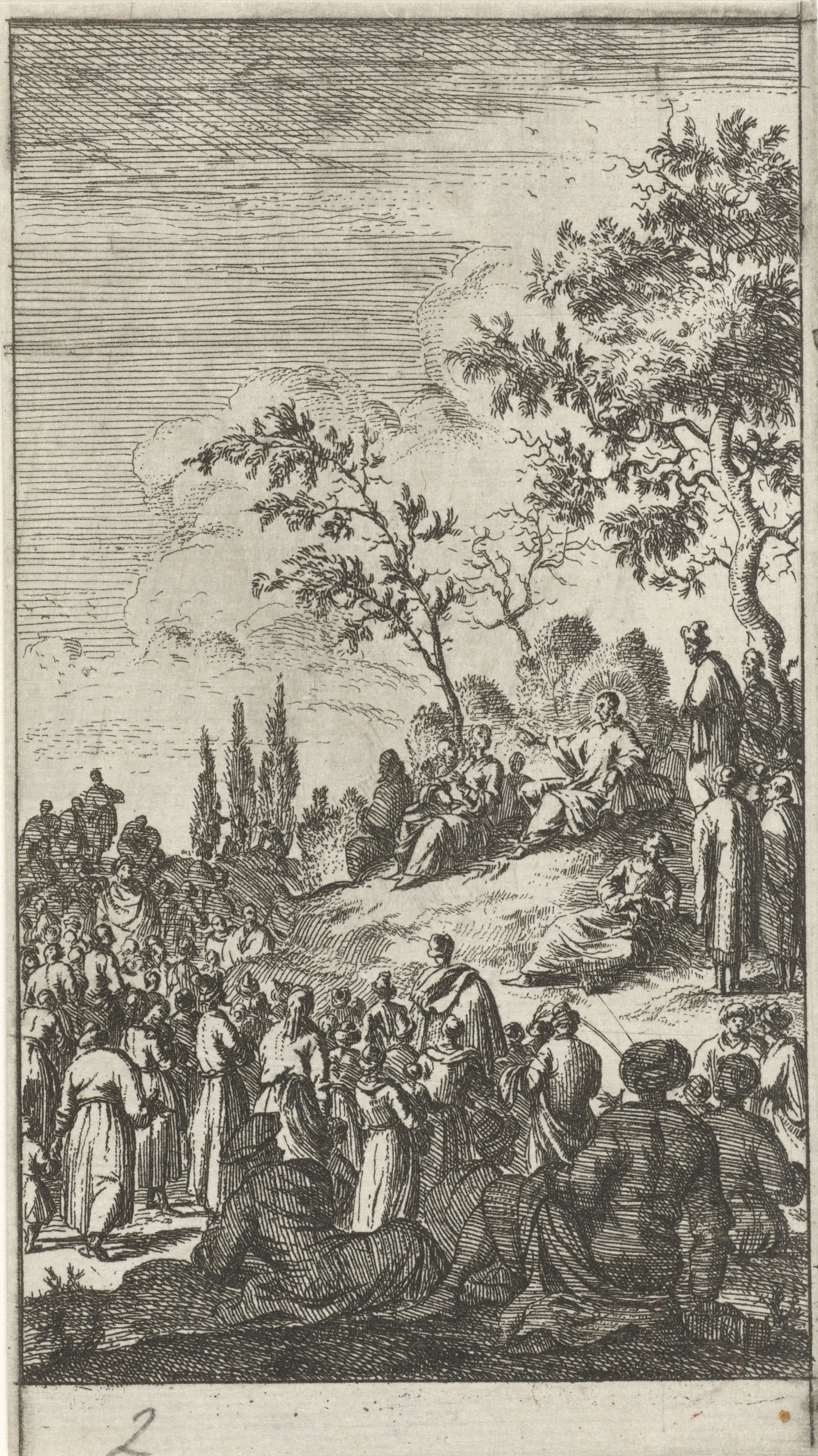
- Sermon on the mount. Jan Luyken (1681 - 1762).
- Book: Gospel of Matthew
- Christian Bible part: New Testament

Matthew 7:16 is the sixteenth verse of the seventh chapter of the Gospel of Matthew in the New Testament and is part of the Sermon on the Mount. This verse continues the section warning against false prophets.

== Content ==
In the King James Version of the Bible the text reads:

Ye shall know them by their fruits. Do men
gather grapes of thorns, or figs of thistles?

The World English Bible translates the passage as:

By their fruits you will know them. Do you
gather grapes from thorns, or figs from thistles?

The Novum Testamentum Graece text is:

ἀπὸ τῶν καρπῶν αὐτῶν ἐπιγνώσεσθε αὐτούς
μήτι συλλέγουσιν ἀπὸ ἀκανθῶν σταφυλὰς ἢ ἀπὸ τριβόλων σῦκα;

For a collection of other versions see Matthew 7:16.

== Analysis ==
The previous verse warned against false prophets, and in this one Jesus tells his followers how to identify them. He does so by beginning an alternative metaphor, wholly separate from the wolves and sheep one of the previous verse. The alternative metaphor turns to botany. It specifically refers to grapes and figs, which were both common crops in the region. Thornbushes and thistles also flourished in the region, and were a constant problem to farmers. Jesus states that one will be able to identify false prophets by their fruits. False prophets will not produce good fruits. Fruits, which are a common metaphor in both the Old and New Testaments, represent the outward manifestation of a person's faith, thus their behaviour and their works. A similar illustration appears in the deuterocanonical Book of Sirach:

[As] fruit discloses the cultivation of a tree, so a person’s speech discloses the cultivation of his mind.

This warning is paralleled in Luke 6:44 and appears again at Matthew 12:33; a similar fruit metaphor also appears in Matthew 3. In those other places the verse is an attack on the Pharisees, but here it targets false Christian prophets. Matthew also differs in wording from Luke 6:44. In Luke Jesus' words are a declarative statement, while in Matthew they are a rhetorical question. Matthew reverses the order of the grapes and figs from Luke. He also replaces Luke's briarbush with thistles. Gundry feels that thistles were added to create a rhyme with thornbush in the original Greek. He also feels that the author of Matthew is imagining a thornbush as a corrupted version of a grapevine and a thistle as version of a fig tree.

This verse is thus usually understood as saying that one should not simply judge a prophet by their words, but what is implied by fruits has been much debated. F. Dale Bruner notes that there are two competing views. Fruits can be read as referring to the behaviour and life of these false prophets. If their behaviour is not pious, one should not expect their words to be. This opinion was first advanced by John Chrysostom and is supported by many modern scholars such as Eduard Schweizer and Ulrich Luz. The alternate view is that fruits refers to the teachings of the false prophets, that the false prophets will be noticeable by teachings that don't conform to correct doctrine. This understanding has been supported by Augustine, Jerome, Martin Luther, and John Calvin.

== Commentary from the Church Fathers ==
Chrysostom: Yet He may seem here to have aimed under the title of false prophets, not so much at the heretic, as at those who, while their life is corrupt, yet wear an outward face of virtuousness; whence it is said, By their fruits ye shall know them. For among heretics it is possible many times to find a good life, but among those I have named never.

Augustine: Wherefore it is justly asked, what fruits then He would have us look to? For many esteem among fruits some things which pertain to the sheep's clothing, and in this manner are deceived concerning wolves. For they practise fasting, almsgiving, or praying, which they display before men, seeking to please those to whom these things seem difficult. These then are not the fruits by which He teaches us to discern them. Those deeds which are done with good intention, are the proper fleece of the sheep itself, such as are done with bad intention, or in error, are nothing else than a clothing of wolves; but the sheep ought not to hate their own clothing because it is often used to hide wolves. What then are the fruits by which we may know an evil tree? The Apostle says, The works of the flesh are manifest, which are, fornication, uncleanness, &c. (Gal. 5:19.) And which are they by which we may know a good tree? The same Apostle teaches, saying, The fruits of the Spirit are love, joy, peace.

Pseudo-Chrysostom: The fruits of a man are the confession of his faith and the works of his life; for he who utters according to God the words of humility and a true confession, is the sheep; but he who against the truth howls forth blasphemies against God, is the wolf.

Jerome: What is here spoken of false prophets we may apply to all whose dress and speech promise one thing, and their actions exhibit another. But it is specially to be understood of heretics, who by observing temperance, chastity, and fasting, surround themselves as it were with a garment of sanctity, but inasmuch as their hearts within them are poisoned, they deceive the souls of the more simple brethren.

Augustine: But from their actions we may conjecture whether this their outward appearance is put on for display. For when by any temptations those things are withdrawn or denied them which they had either attained or sought to attain by this evil, then needs must that it appear whether they be the wolf in sheep's clothing, or the sheep in his own.

Gregory the Great: Also the hypocrite is restrained by peaceful times of Holy Church, and therefore appears clothed with godliness; but let any trial of faith ensue, straight the wolf ravenous at heart strips himself of his sheep's skin, and shows by persecuting how great his rage against the good.

Chrysostom: And a hypocrite is easily discerned; for the way they are commanded to walk is a hard way, and the hypocrite is loth to toil. And that you may not say that you are unable to find out them that are such, He again enforces what He had said by example from men, saying, Do men gather grapes of thorns, or figs of thistles?

Augustine: In this place we must guard against the error of such as imagine that the two trees refer to two different natures; the one of God, the other not. But we affirm that they derive no countenance from these two trees; as it will be evident to any who will read the context that He is speaking here of men.

Preceded by Matthew 7:15	Gospel of Matthew; Chapter 7	Succeeded by Matthew 7:17
