= Matthew 7:14 =

- ← 7:13 7:15 →
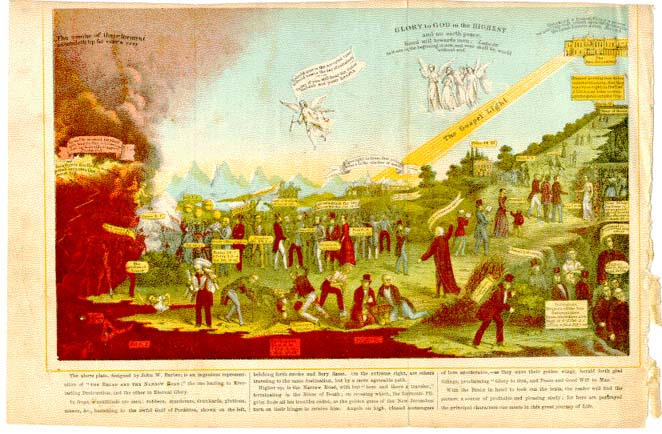
- 19th century depiction of "The Broad and the Narrow Road"
- Book: Gospel of Matthew
- Christian Bible part: New Testament

Matthew 7:14 is the fourteenth verse of the seventh chapter of the Gospel of Matthew in the New Testament and is part of the Sermon on the Mount. This verse continues a metaphor begun in the previous one about the ease of following the wrong path.

== Content ==
In the King James Version of the Bible the text reads:

Because strait is the gate, and narrow is the way, which leadeth unto life, and few there be that find it.

The World English Bible translates the passage as:

How narrow is the gate, and restricted is the way that leads to life! Few are those who find it.

The Novum Testamentum Graece text is:

ὅτι στενὴ ἡ πύλη καὶ τεθλιμμένη ἡ ὁδὸς ἡ ἀπάγουσα εἰς τὴν ζωήν, καὶ ὀλίγοι εἰσὶν οἱ εὑρίσκοντες αὐτήν.

For additional translations see here: Matthew 7:14

== Analysis ==
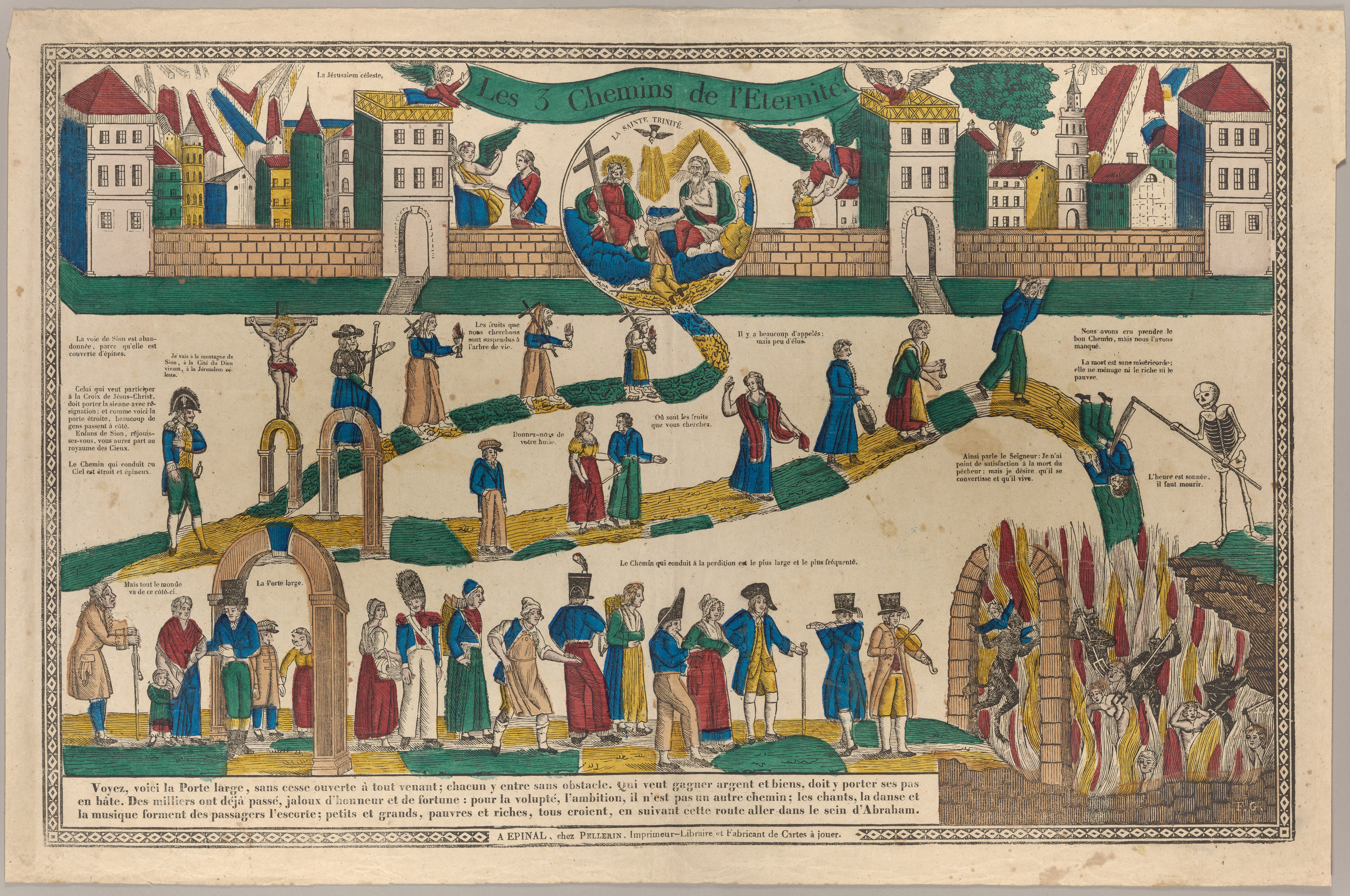
"The 3 Roads to Eternity", a folk-art allegorical map based on Matthew 7:13–14 by the woodcutter Georgin François in 1825

As with the word destruction in the previous verse, the word life seems to have eschatological meaning. In other parts of Matthew, the word life is used to stand for eternal salvation.

What is meant by restricted is somewhat in doubt. The term can be read to mean that the narrow route is overcrowded, but this contradicts the idea that only a few find it. Ulrich Luz notes that it could imply that the route is a hard and difficult one to follow, as the sermon has implied the proper path is one of tribulation and suffering. Another view is that the proper way is so narrow that it is difficult to find, and requires effort and searching to find.

The metaphor in this verse implies that the path of sin is an easy one to follow, and that one will do so without conscious effort not to. Davies and Allison note that the notion of vice being a far easier path than virtue is a common one to most religions. The verse seems clear that it is only a minority that will find and follow God's path. While pessimistic, this is in keeping with Jewish thought, which traditionally saw the pious as a beleaguered minority in a world of sinners. In other parts of the Gospel, such as Matthew 7:13, Jesus does state that many (though not necessarily most) are saved, so it can not be too small a number that find the narrow gate.

== Commentary from the Church Fathers ==
Glossa Ordinaria: "Though love be wide, yet it leads men from the earth through difficult and steep ways. It is sufficiently difficult to cast aside all other things, and to love One only, not to aim at prosperity, not to fear adversity."

Chrysostom: "But seeing He declares below, My yoke is pleasant, and my burden light, how is it that He says here that the way is strait and narrow? Even here He teaches that it is light and pleasant; for here is a way and a gate as that other, which is called the wide and broad, has also a way and a gate. Of these nothing is to remain; but all pass away. But to pass through toil and sweat, and to arrive at a good end, namely life, is sufficient solace to those who undergo these struggles. For if sailors can make light of storms and soldiers of wounds in hope of perishable rewards, much more when Heaven lies before, and rewards immortal, will none look to the impending dangers. Moreover the very circumstance that He calls it strait contributes to make it easy; by this He warned them to be always watching; this the Lord speaks to rouse our desires. He who strives in a combat, if he sees the prince admiring the efforts of the combatants, gets greater heart. Let us not therefore be sad when many sorrows befal us here, for the way is strait, but not the city; therefore neither need we look for rest here, nor expect any thing of sorrow there. When He says, Few there be that find it, He points to the sluggishness of the many, and instructs His hearers not to look to the prosperity of the many, but to the toils of the few."

Jerome: "Attend to the words, for they have an especial force, many walk in the broad way—few find the narrow way. For the broad way needs no search, and is not found, but presents itself readily; it is the way of all who go astray. Whereas the narrow way neither do all find, nor when they have found, do they straightway walk therein. Many, after they have found the way of truth, caught by the pleasures of the world, desert midway."

| Preceded by Matthew 7:13 | Gospel of Matthew; Chapter 7 | Succeeded by Matthew 7:15 |
