= Matthew 7:25 =

- ← 7:24 7:26 →
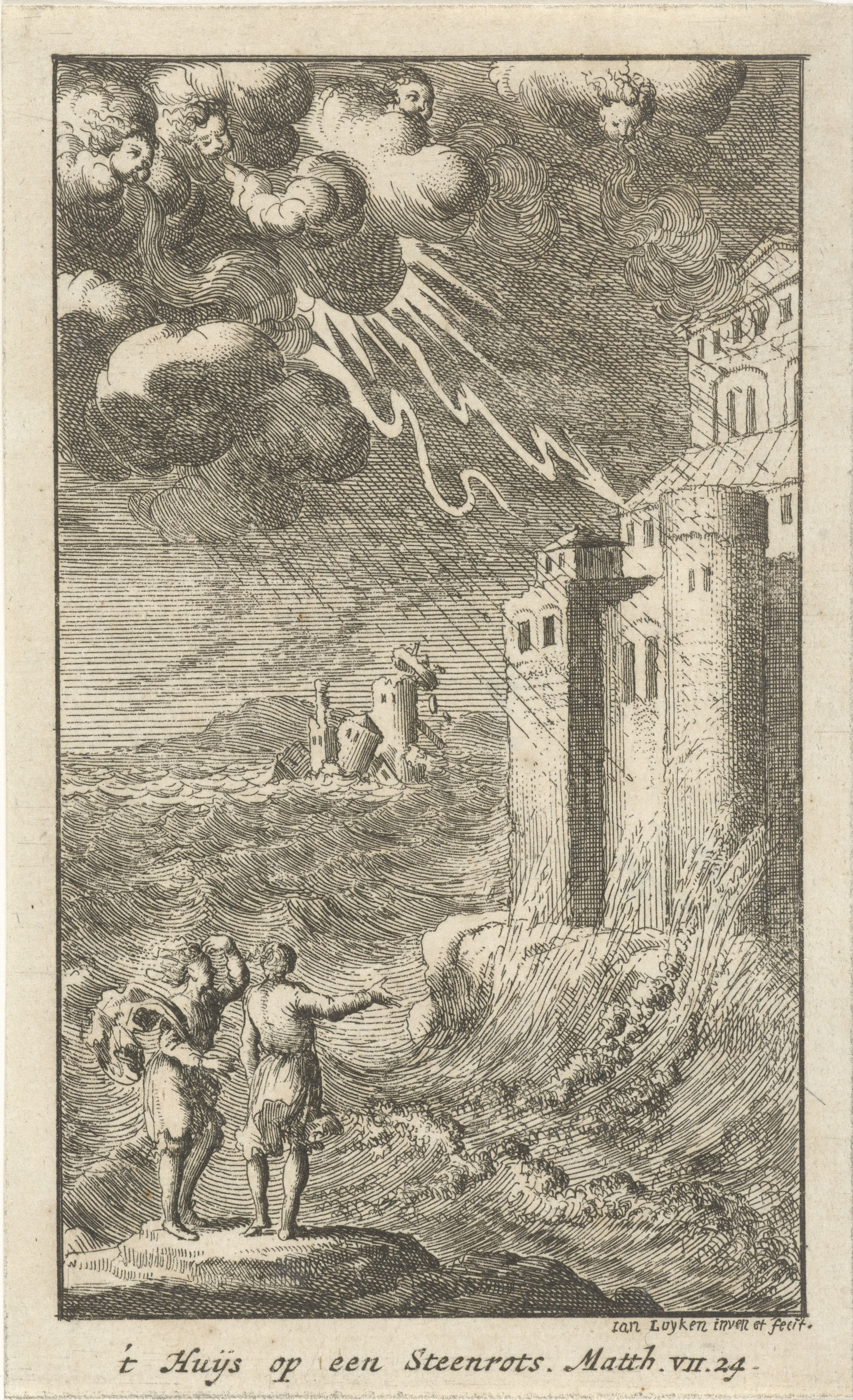
- Illustration to Matthew 7:24–27: A house built upon a rock. Jan Luyken (1681).
- Book: Gospel of Matthew
- Christian Bible part: New Testament

Matthew 7:25 is the twenty-fifth verse of the seventh chapter of the Gospel of Matthew in the New Testament and is part of the Sermon on the Mount. This verse continues the Parable of the Wise and the Foolish Builders.

== Content ==
In the King James Version of the Bible the text reads:

And the rain descended, and the floods came, and the winds blew, and
beat upon that house; and it fell not: for it was founded upon a rock.

The World English Bible translates the passage as:

The rain came down, the floods came, and the winds blew, and beat
on that house; and it didn’t fall, for it was founded on the rock.

The Novum Testamentum Graece text is:

καὶ κατέβη ἡ βροχὴ καὶ ἦλθον οἱ ποταμοὶ καὶ ἔπνευσαν οἱ ἄνεμοι
καὶ προσέπεσαν τῇ οἰκίᾳ ἐκείνῃ, καὶ οὐκ ἔπεσεν· τεθεμελίωτο γὰρ ἐπὶ τὴν πέτραν.

For a collection of other versions see BibleHub Matthew 7:25.

== Analysis ==
The previous verse introduced the wise man who built his house on a rock, the rock being a metaphor for the teachings of Jesus in the Sermon on the Mount.

The fury of nature is much more elaborate than the version of this parable in Luke, where at Luke 6:48 there is only an overflowing river. This could indicate that Matthew and Luke were written in regions where different natural disasters were most concerning. Floods were a very real problem in Palestine. Many wadis that had been dry for years could be hit with a flash flood after a large storm. Floods occur as a disaster again in Matthew 25, and many times elsewhere in the Bible, with the Great Flood being the most prominent.

Origen read the storms in this verse as representing persecution, and that despite the attacks of outsiders the persecutions will mean nothing to those with a solid foundation of faith. Augustine presented the disasters as metaphors for specific human failings. Rains represented superstition, rivers carnal lusts, and winds rumours. Most scholars today read the verse as an eschatological metaphor.

Preceded by Matthew 7:24	Gospel of Matthew; Chapter 7	Succeeded by Matthew 7:26
