= Matthew 7:21 =

- ← 7:20 7:22 →
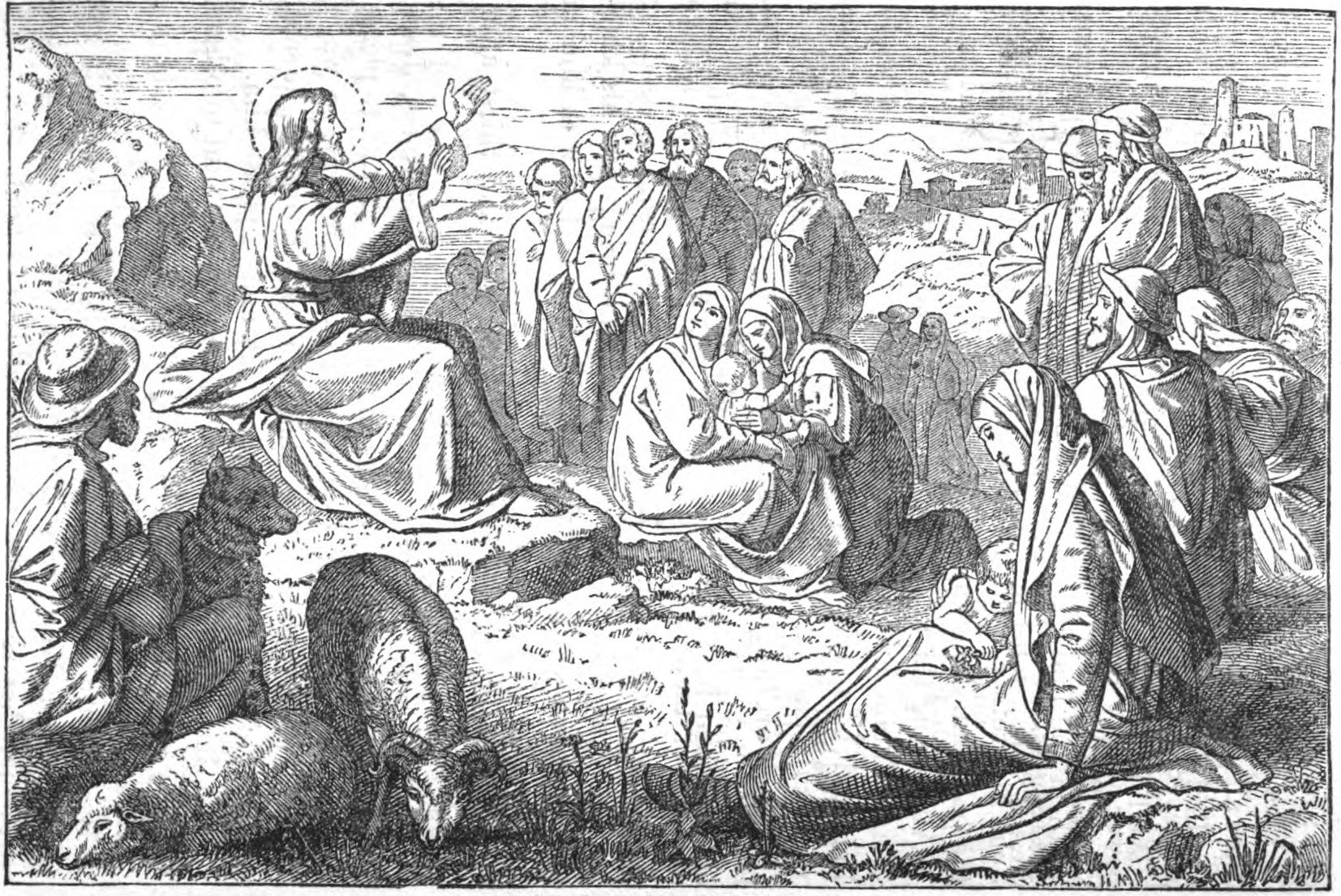
- "The sermon on the mount" (1873). From The story of the Bible from Genesis to Revelation
- Book: Gospel of Matthew
- Christian Bible part: New Testament

Matthew 7:21 is the twenty-first verse of the seventh chapter of the Gospel of Matthew in the New Testament and is part of the Sermon on the Mount. This verse continues Jesus' warning against false prophets.

== Content ==
In the King James Version of the Bible the text reads:

Not every one that saith unto me, Lord, Lord, shall
enter into the kingdom of heaven; but he that doeth
the will of my Father which is in heaven.

The World English Bible translates the passage as:

Not everyone who says to me, ‘Lord, Lord,’ will
enter into the Kingdom of Heaven; but he who
does the will of my Father who is in heaven.

The Novum Testamentum Graece text is:

Οὐ πᾶς ὁ λέγων μοι Κύριε Κύριε,
εἰσελεύσεται εἰς τὴν βασιλείαν τῶν οὐρανῶν,
ἀλλ’ ὁ ποιῶν τὸ θέλημα τοῦ Πατρός μου τοῦ ἐν τοῖς οὐρανοῖς.

Other scripture to bear in mind with the will of God, in James 1:22, 2:24, and 1 John 2:17 and 5:3.

For a collection of other versions see BibleHub Matthew 7:21

== Analysis ==
This verse is parallelled by Luke 6:46, but in Luke the phrasing is directed at the crowd itself, while in Matthew it is against the hypothetical false prophets.

This verse states that some of those who claim to be good Christians will be rejected by Jesus if they have not carried out the will of God. The scholarly view is that Jesus in this set of verses is presenting himself as a witness before God at the Last Judgment, being consulted by God on who should enter but with the final decision being made by the Father.

The word translated as Lord is kyrie, this is the first time in Matthew that this title is used in reference to Jesus. It is a title of polite address, and Hill notes that sir might be a more literal interpretation. It is also a title by which it was common to address a rabbi or elder. There is evidence that it is a stronger wording than just sir and lord or master are closer to the original. The next verse makes clear that the lord being referenced here is the lord of the last judgment. It was also a common address for a teacher, and Harrington believes the meaning of this verse is that one needs to practice the teachings of Jesus and not just speak them. Kyrie is also close to ho Kyrios, the term used by the Septuagint to translate the Tetragrammaton. The Gospel of Matthew never uses that title to refer to Jesus, though the Gospel of Luke does so.

This verse contains a collection Matthew favourite phrases, such as "Kingdom of Heaven" and "Father in Heaven." Gundry notes that "enter the kingdom of heaven" appears three other times in the Gospel, at Matthew 5:20, 18:3, and 23:13. The reference to the kingdom of heaven is not found in Luke, continuing Matthew's pattern of being far more eschatological.

== Commentary from the Church Fathers ==
Jerome: As He had said above that those who have the robe of a good life are yet not to be received because of the impiety of their doctrines; so now on the other hand, He forbids us to participate the faith with those who while they are strong in sound doctrine, destroy it with evil works. For it behoves the servants of God that both their work should be approved by their teaching and their teaching by their works. And therefore He says, Not every one that saith unto me, Lord, Lord, enters into the kingdom of heaven.

Chrysostom: Wherein He seems to touch the Jews chiefly who placed everything in dogmas; as Paul accuses them, If thou art called a Jew, and restest in the Law. (Rom. 2:17.)

Pseudo-Chrysostom: Otherwise; Having taught that the false prophets and the true are to be discerned by their fruits, He now goes on to teach more plainly what are the fruits by which we are to discern the godly from the ungodly teachers.

Augustine: For even in the very name of Christ we must be on our guard against heretics, and all that understand amiss and love this world, that we may not be deceived, and therefore He says, Not every one that saith unto me, Lord, Lord. But it may fairly create a difficulty how this is to be reconciled with that of the Apostle, No man can say that Jesus is the Lord, but by the Holy Ghost. (1 Cor. 12:3.) For we cannot say that those who are not to enter into the kingdom of heaven have the Holy Spirit. But the Apostle uses the word ‘say,’ to express the will and understanding of him that says it. He only properly says a thing, who by the sound of his voice expresses his will and purpose. But the Lord uses the word in its ordinary sense, for he seems to say who neither wishes nor understands what he says.

Jerome: For Scripture uses to take words for deeds; according to which the Apostle declares, They make confession that they know God, but in works deny him. (Tit. 1:16.)

Augustine: Let us not therefore think that this belongs to those fruits of which He had spoken above, when one says to our Lord, Lord, Lord; and thence seems to us to be a good tree; the true fruit spoken of is to do the will of God; whence it follows, But who doeth the will of my Father which is in heaven, he shall enter into the kingdom of heaven.

Hilary of Poitiers: For obeying God's will and not calling on His name, shall find the way to the heavenly kingdom.

Pseudo-Chrysostom: And what the will of God is the Lord Himself teaches, This is, (John 6:40.) He says, the will of him that sent me, that every man that seeth the Son and believeth on him should have eternal life. The word believe has reference both to confession and conduct. He then who does not confess Christ, or does not walk according to His word, shall not enter into the kingdom of heaven.

Chrysostom: He said not he that doth My will, but the will of my Father, for it was fit so to adapt it in the meanwhile to their weakness. But the one secretly implied the other, seeing the will of the Son is no other than the will of the Father.

| Preceded by Matthew 7:20 | Gospel of Matthew; Chapter 7 | Succeeded by Matthew 7:22 |
