= Matthew 7:24 =

- ← 7:23 7:25 →
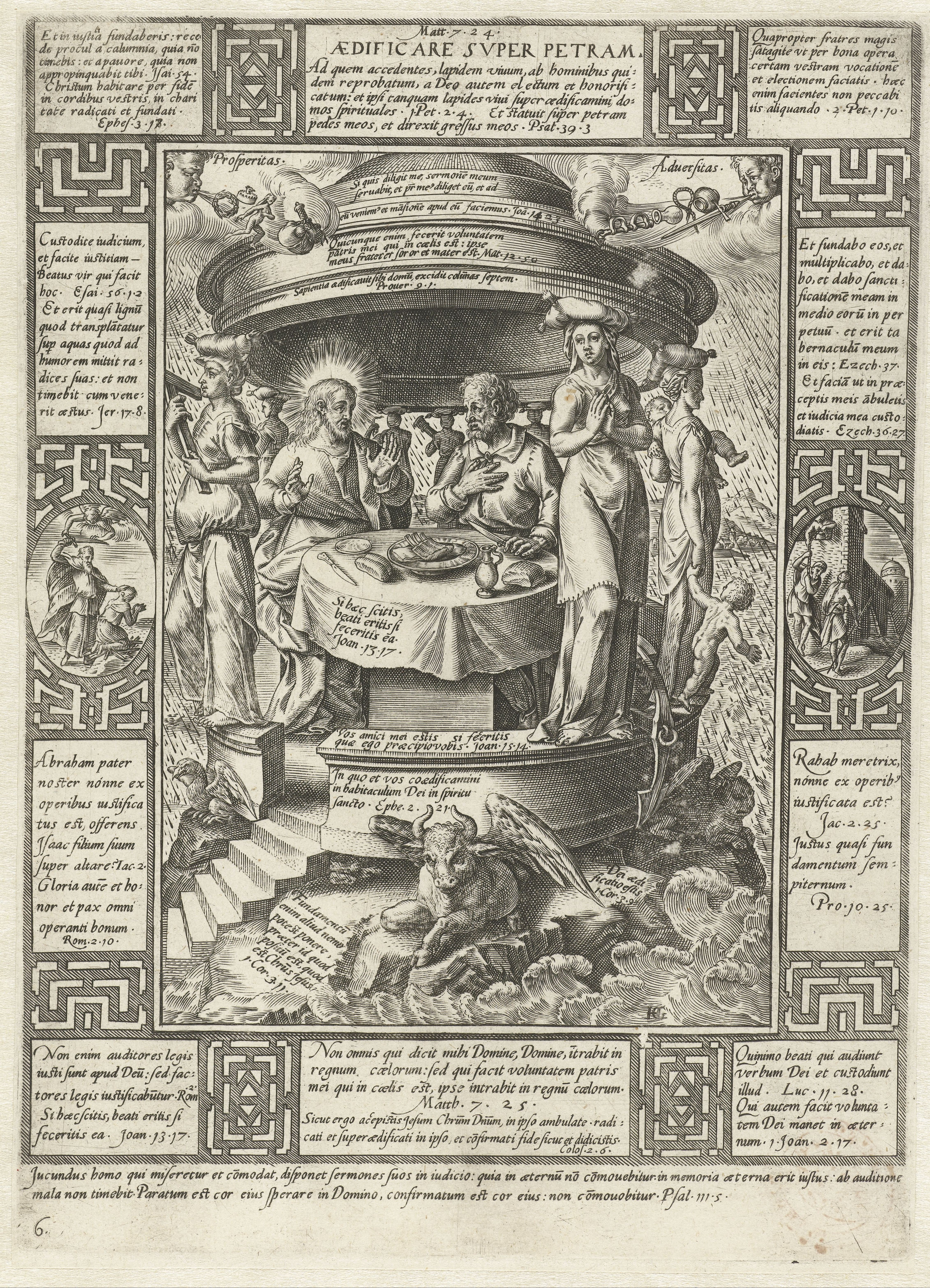
- Illustration to Matthew 7:24–27: A house built upon a rock. Hendrick Goltzius (1598 - 1604).
- Book: Gospel of Matthew
- Christian Bible part: New Testament

Matthew 7:24 is the twenty-fourth verse of the seventh chapter of the Gospel of Matthew in the New Testament and is part of the Sermon on the Mount. This verse begins the Parable of the Wise and the Foolish Builders.

== Content ==
In the King James Version of the Bible the text reads:

Therefore whosoever heareth these sayings of mine, and doeth them,
I will liken him unto a wise man, which built his house upon a rock:

The World English Bible translates the passage as:

"Everyone therefore who hears these words of mine, and does them,
I will liken him to a wise man, who built his house on a rock.

The Novum Testamentum Graece text is:

Πᾶς οὖν ὅστις ἀκούει μου τοὺς λόγους τούτους καὶ ποιεῖ αὐτούς,
ὁμοιωθήσεται ἀνδρὶ φρονίμῳ, ὅστις ᾠκοδόμησεν αὐτοῦ τὴν οἰκίαν ἐπὶ τὴν πέτραν.

For a collection of other versions see BibleHub Matthew 7:24

== Analysis ==
The previous verses had discussed an array of rules for proper behaviour and worship. This verse begins a parable of two house builders, one wise and one foolish. The use of the phrase "these words of mine" is an indication that this parable is a summation and conclusion to the entire Sermon on the Mount. The verse includes the word poiein (to do), which is repeated regularly in this section of the sermon and emphasizes that action upon the teachings is required, not just listening to them. Catholic exigetes have interpreted this as evidence for the doctrine of justification by works.

A "wise man" is an expression that appears in three other sections of Matthew: Matthew 10:16, 24:46, and 25:2-9.

This parable is also found in Luke, where it ends the Sermon on the Plain. In Luke there are some important differences from Matthew. Matthew has the house being built on rock, and it thus being secured by good choice of location. In Luke there is more detail on the construction house, and the wise man's house is well built because it had a deep foundation. One theory is that each version is adapted to a local audience, with deep foundations being a common Greek practice, but not one as familiar to the Jewish readers of Matthew. The reference to a structure being built on rock may also parallel Peter and the church in Matthew 16:18. That it is the location that is the important matter can also serve as a theological indication about how fundamental the difference is between the wise and the foolish. Schweizer connects to the earlier metaphors of wolves vs. sheep and different species of trees.

== Commentary from the Church Fathers ==
Chrysostom: Because there would be some who would admire the things that were said by the Lord, but would not add that showing forth of them which is in action, He threatens them before, saying, Every man that hears these words of mine, and does them, shall be likened to a wise man.

Preceded by Matthew 7:23	Gospel of Matthew; Chapter 7	Succeeded by Matthew 7:25
