= Nikolay Lomtev =

Russian painter

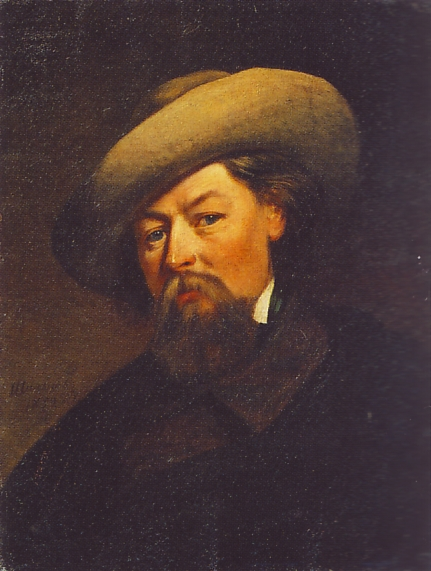
- Nikolay Lomtev (1859) portrait by ru:Pavel Shiltsov
- Born: Nikolay Petrovich Lomtev c. December 10, 1816 or November 28, 1817 (sources vary); Rostov, Russian Empire
- Died: c. 1858-1859 (aged 40–43); St. Petersburg, Russian Empire
- Education: Imperial Academy of Arts (1845)
- Known for: Painting

Nikolay Petrovich Lomtev (Russian: Николай Петрович Ломтев; (c. 1816-1817 – c. 1858-1859) was a Russian history painter and graphic artist in the Academic style.

== Biography ==
He was born to a merchant family from Rostov in either 1816 or 1817. In the mid-1830s, the family moved to Saint Petersburg and his father was registered with the merchant's guild. Around 1837, he entered the Academy of Fine Arts and studied with the history painter, Fyodor Bruni. In 1838, Bruni went to Rome to complete some work there and he followed in 1839, at his father's expense.

In 1840, when Bruni returned to Russia, he stayed in Italy, using up his money and lapsing into drunkenness. Despite this, he continued to copy the Old Masters, sketch landscapes and keep a detailed diary of his struggles.

In 1846, at his father's request, he returned to Saint Petersburg and was awarded the title of "Artist" by the academy for his painting of Angels proclaiming the punishment of Sodom and Gomorrah. He continued to paint primarily Biblical and historical scenes, although he also did landscapes. Some of his works were among the first bought by Pavel Tretyakov but, overall, they were not financially successful and, by the late 1850s, he was once again on the verge of poverty.

After his father's death, he received a legacy that made him financially independent but, not long after, he died from a "cold" (more likely influenza or pneumonia) in either 1858 or 1859.

== Selected paintings ==
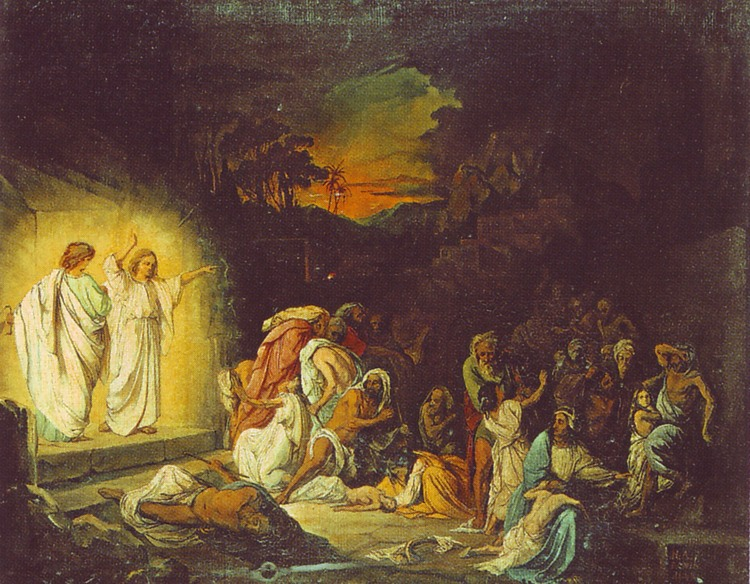
Angels herald the heavenly judgment of Sodom and Gomorrah (1845)

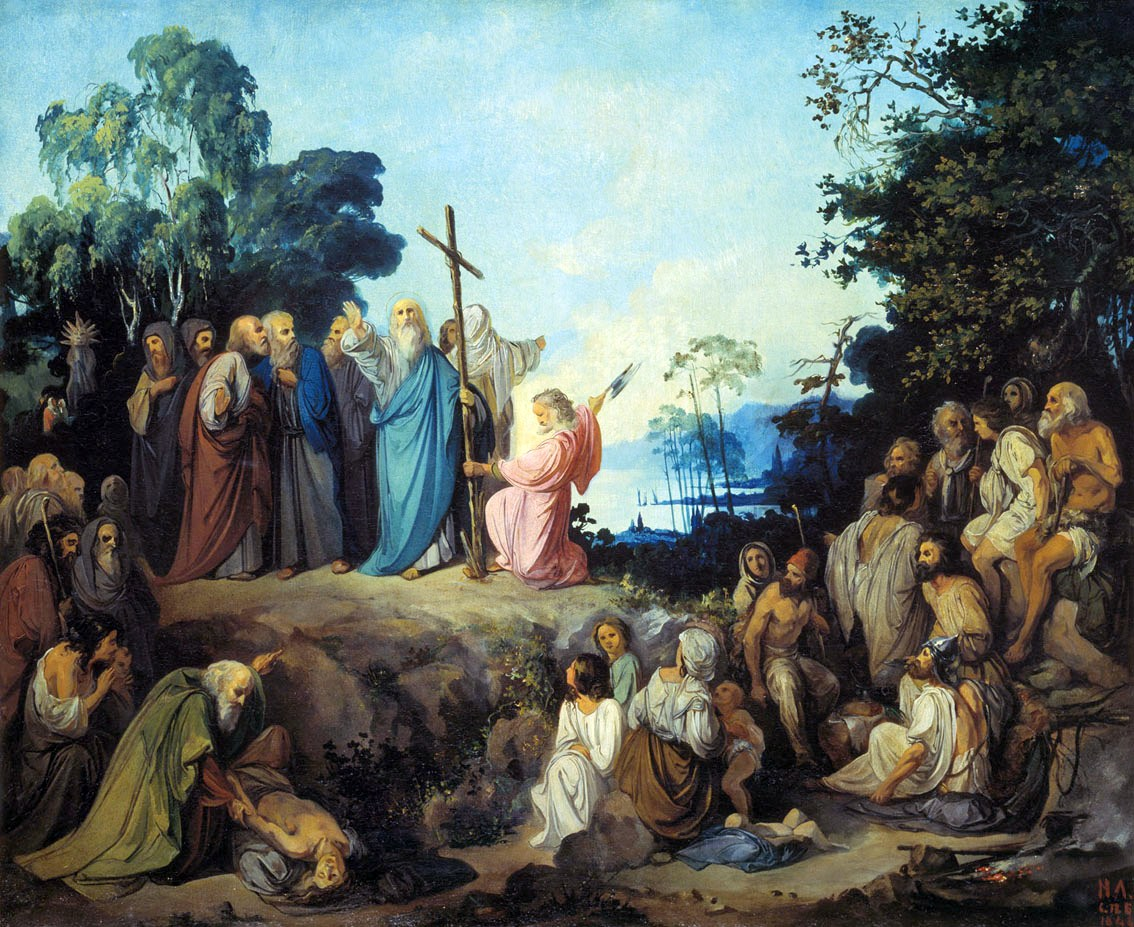
The Apostle Andrew erecting a Cross near present-day Kyiv (1848)

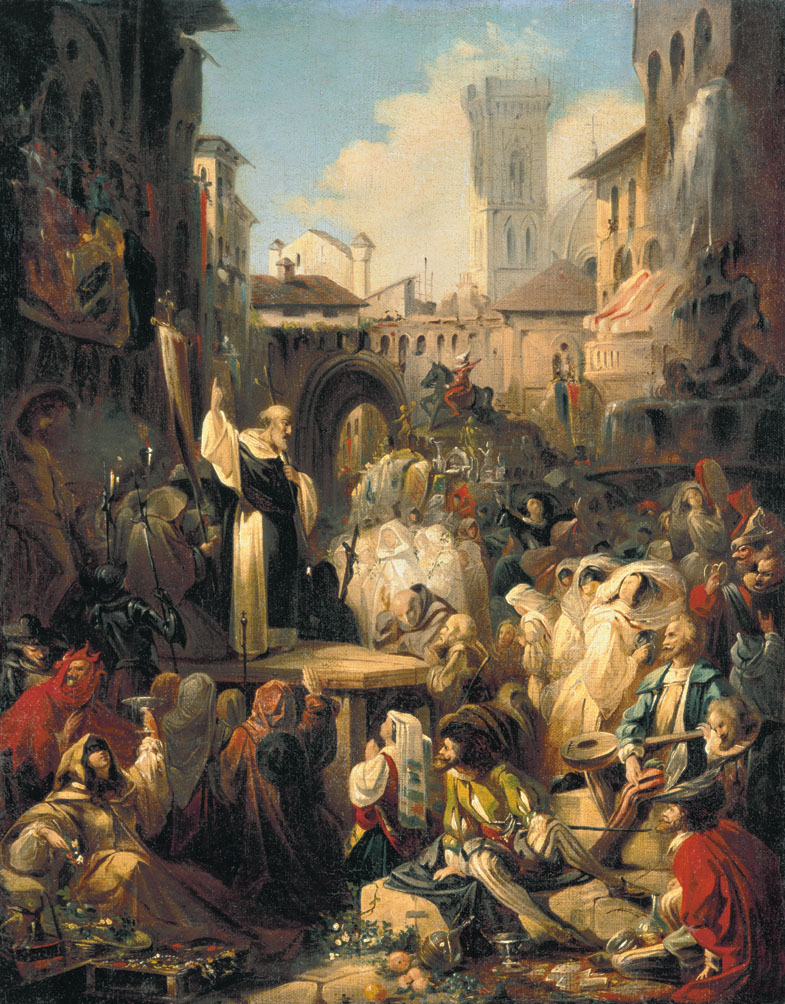
The Sermon of Girolamo Savonarola in Florence (1850s)

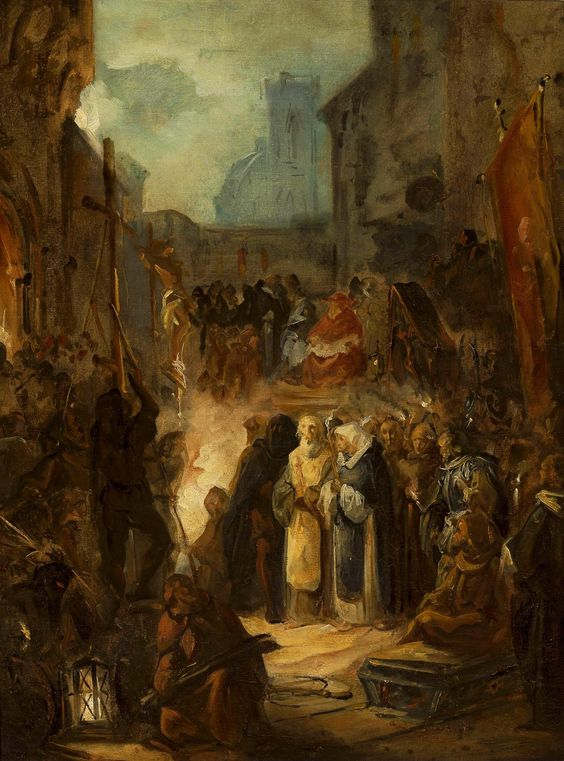
Auto-da-fé (1850-е)
