= Matthew 7:13 =

- ← 7:12 7:14 →
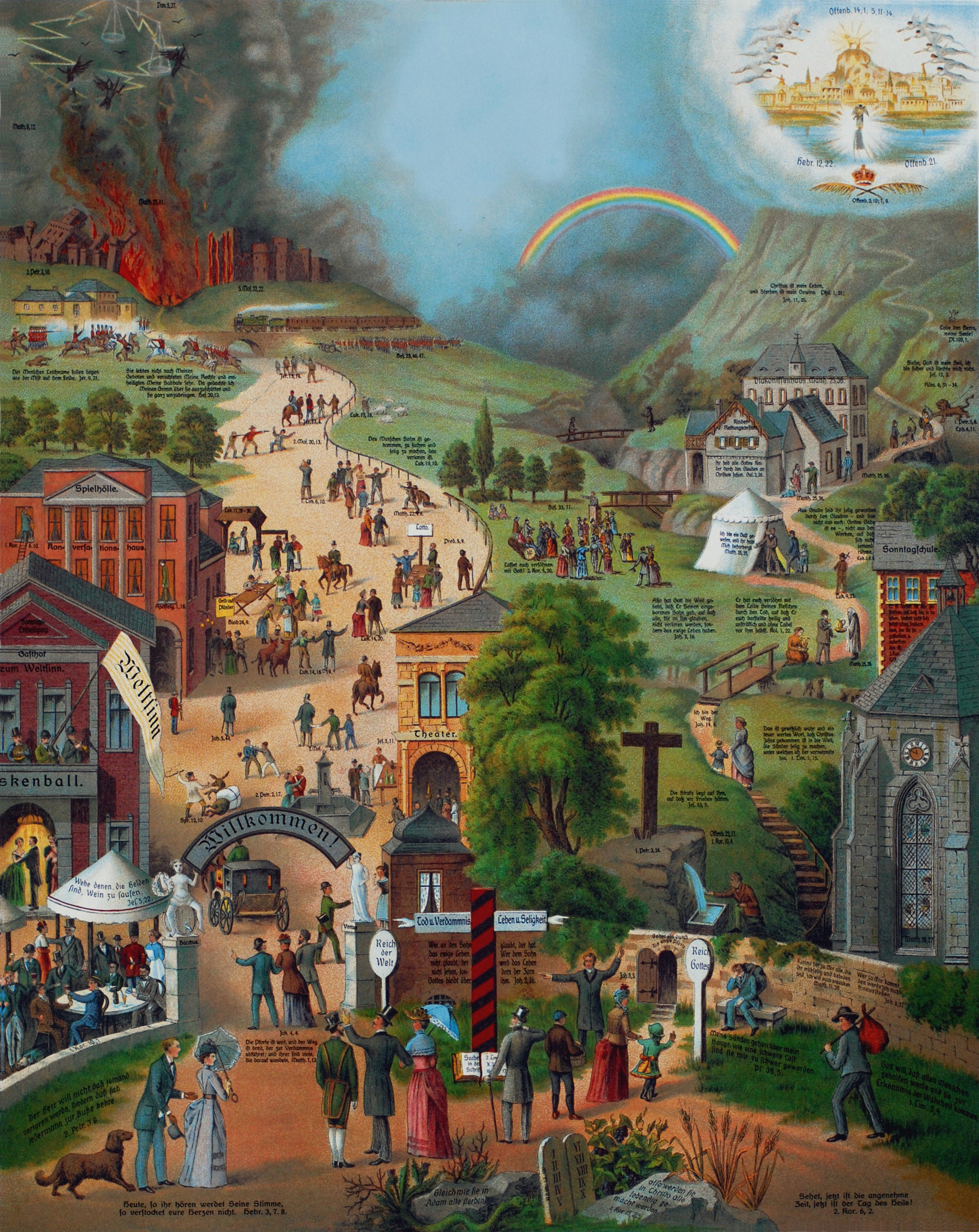
- Der breite und der schmale Weg ("the broad and the narrow road"), from 1866.
- Book: Gospel of Matthew
- Christian Bible part: New Testament

Matthew 7:13 is the thirteenth verse of the seventh chapter of the Gospel of Matthew in the New Testament and is part of the Sermon on the Mount. Luke 13:24 has similar wording in relation to the narrow door or gate.

== Text ==
In the King James Version of the Bible the text reads:

Enter ye in at the strait gate: for wide is the gate, and broad is the way,
that leadeth to destruction, and many there be which go in thereat:

The World English Bible translates the passage as:

Enter in by the narrow gate; for wide is the gate and broad is the
way that leads to destruction, and many are those who enter in by it.

The Novum Testamentum Graece text is:

Εἰσέλθατε διὰ τῆς στενῆς πύλης· ὅτι πλατεῖα ἡ πύλη
καὶ εὐρύχωρος ἡ ὁδὸς ἡ ἀπάγουσα εἰς τὴν ἀπώλειαν, καὶ πολλοί εἰσιν οἱ εἰσερχόμενοι δι’ αὐτῆς·

== Translation and interpretation ==
The word here translated as gate (Greek: πύλης, pylēs) refers to the large entrance to a city or a temple. In the New Testament era many cities had walls, and entry was only allowed through the city gates. The same word is used for the gate of the temple in Jerusalem. Ulrich Luz notes that the idea of the gates of heaven was in existence at the time of Jesus, and this verse may be a reference to that notion.

The metaphor of God providing two ways, one good and one evil, was a common one in the Jewish literature of the period. It appears in the Old Testament in Deuteronomy 30:19 and Jeremiah 21:8. A somewhat similar metaphor appears at Luke 13:24. The context and phrasing of Luke are quite different from that here in Matthew, and Davies and Allison suggest that this makes it less likely that this saying comes from Q. Luz supports the idea that the two gate metaphor was present in Q, and that the author of Matthew merged it with the well known two paths metaphor to create this verse.

This verse, with its reference to the destruction in store for those following the wrong path, is typically seen as eschatological, implying that the destination for those who take the easy way is punishment by God. Davies and Allison note that J.D.M. Derrett supports a very different interpretation. He argues that if the metaphor is referring to the entrance to a city or to a gate in the middle of the road, that this implies that the ultimate destination is the same. Once both groups are through the gate they will find themselves in the same place. Derrett thus argues that this metaphor states that it is the journey of the sinner which is hard and destructive, but that after facing this turbulent journey the sinner, like the pious, will ultimately find God's grace.

== Commentary from the Church Fathers ==
Augustine: The Lord had warned us above to have a heart single and pure with which to seek God; but as this belongs to but few, He begins to speak of finding out wisdom. For the searching out and contemplation whereof there has been formed through all the foregoing such an eye as may discern the narrow way and strait gate; whence He adds, Enter ye in at the strait gate.

Glossa Ordinaria: Though it be hard to do to another what you would have done to yourself; yet so must we do, that we may enter the strait gate.

Pseudo-Chrysostom: Otherwise; This third precept again is connected with the right method of fasting, and the order of discourse will be this; But thou when thou fastest anoint thy head; and after comes, Enter ye in at the strait gate. For there are three chief passions in our nature, that are most adhering to the flesh; the desire of food and drink; the love of the man towards the woman; and thirdly, sleep. These it is harder to cut off from the fleshly nature than the other passions. And therefore abstinence from no other passion so sanctifies the body as that a man should be chaste, abstinent, and continuing in watchings. On account therefore of all these righteousnesses, but above all on account of the most toilsome fasting, it is that He says, Enter ye in at the strait gate. The gate of perdition is the Devil, through whom we enter into hell; the gate of life is Christ, through whom we enter into the kingdom of Heaven. The Devil is said to be a wide gate, not extended by the mightiness of his power, but made broad by the license of his unbridled pride. Christ is said to be a strait gate not with respect to smallness of power, but to His humility; for He whom the whole world contains not, shut Himself within the limits of the Virgin's womb. The way of perdition is sin of any kind It is said to be broad, because it is not contained within the rule of any discipline, but they that walk therein follow whatever pleases them. The way of life is all righteousness, and is called narrow for the contrary reasons. It must be considered that unless one walk in the way, he cannot arrive at the gate; so they that walk not in the way of righteousness, it is impossible that they should truly know Christ. Likewise neither does he run into the hands of the Devil, unless he walks in the way of sinners.

== Modern commentaries ==
Charles Ellicott and Heinrich August Wilhelm Meyer both saw a connection between the strait gate of Matthew 7:13 and Jesus's declaration "I am the gate" in John 10:9.

The eighteenth-century hymn-writer Isaac Watts referred to the broad and narrow ways in his hymn "Broad is the Road".

== See also ==
- Eye of a needle
- Didache#The Two Ways

Preceded by Matthew 7:12	Gospel of Matthew; Chapter 7	Succeeded by Matthew 7:14
