= False prophet =

Person who falsely claims the gift of prophecy or divine inspiration

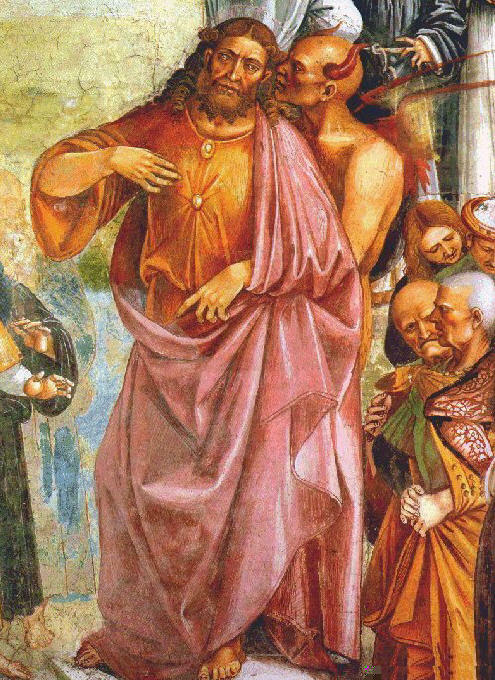
The Devil whispers to the Antichrist; detail from Sermons and Deeds of the Antichrist, Luca Signorelli, 1501, Orvieto Cathedral.

In Abrahamic religions, a false prophet or pseudoprophet is a person who falsely claims the gift of prophecy or divine revelation, or to speak for God, or who makes such claims for evil ends. Often, someone who is considered a "true prophet" by some people is simultaneously considered a "false prophet" by others, even within the same religion as the "prophet" in question. In a wider sense, it is anyone who, without having it, claims a special connection to the deity and sets themself up as a source of spirituality, as an authority, preacher, or teacher. Analogously, the term is sometimes applied outside religion to describe someone who fervently promotes a theory that the speaker thinks is false.

== Judaism ==
Jesus is rejected in every branch of Judaism as a failed Jewish Messiah claimant and a false prophet.

False prophets are depicted and described in the Hebrew Bible; Deuteronomy 13:1–5 depicts those who claim to be prophets as a test from God, testing whether the people truly love him. The Books of Kings records a story where, under duress from Ahab, the prophet Micaiah depicts God as requesting information from his heavenly counsel as to what he should do with a court of false prophets. This depiction is recorded in 1 Kings 22:19–23:

Micaiah continued, 'Therefore hear the word of the Lord: I saw the Lord sitting on His throne with all the host of heaven standing around Him on His right and on His left.' And the Lord said, 'Who will entice Ahab into attacking Ramoth Gilead and going to his death there?'

One suggested this, and another that. Finally, a spirit came forward, stood before the Lord and said, 'I will entice him.'

'By what means?', the Lord asked.

'I will go out and be a lying spirit in the mouths of all his prophets,' he said.

'You will succeed in enticing him', said the Lord. 'Go and do it.'

So now the Lord has put a lying spirit in the mouths of all these prophets of yours. The Lord has decreed disaster for you.

It is possible that Micaiah meant to depict the false prophets as a test from God. It is also possible that it was meant as a slur on Ahab's prophets, such as Zedekiah, the son of Chenaanah.

False prophecy, including speaking in the name of a god other than the God of Israel or speaking presumptuously in God's name, is described as punishable by death in Deuteronomy 18:20. Likewise, if a prophet makes a prophecy in the name of God that does not come to pass, that is another sign that he is not commissioned of God and that the people need not fear the false prophet (Deuteronomy 18:22).

The Jewish Koine Greek term pseudoprophetes occurs in the Septuagint, in Flavius Josephus' Antiquities of the Jews and The Jewish War, and Philo of Alexandria's Specific Laws. Classical Pagan writers used the term pseudomantis.

== Christianity ==
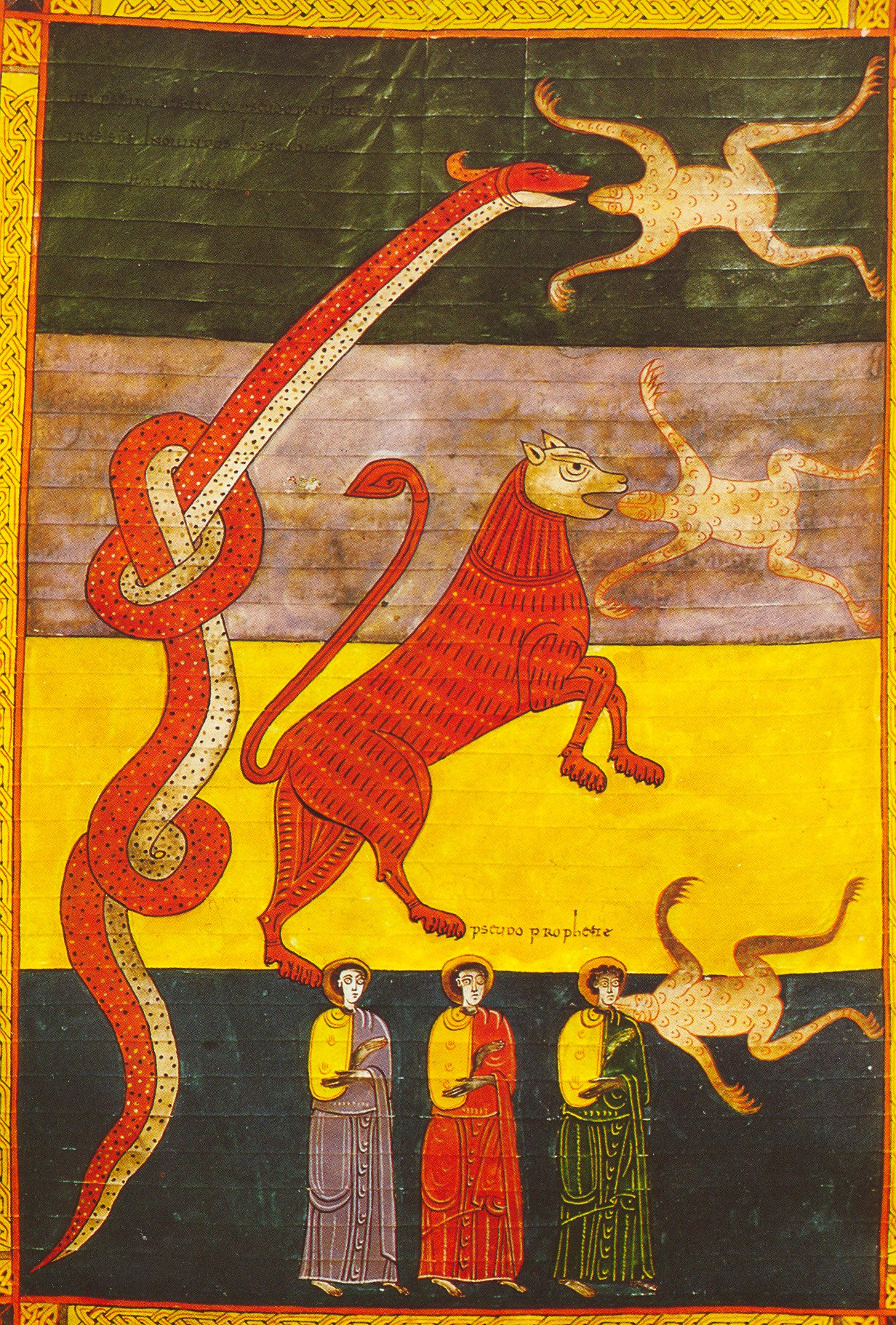
Fate of The False Prophet, Revelation 16, Beatus de Facundus, 1047

Christian eschatology originated with the public life and preaching of Jesus. Throughout the New Testament and some of the early Christian apocryphal writings, Jesus warns his disciples and apostles multiple times of both false prophets and false Messiahs, and believers are frequently adjured to beware of them and stay vigilant.

=== Gospels ===
In the Sermon on the Mount (Matthew 7:15–20), Jesus warns his followers of false prophets:

Beware of false prophets, who come to you in sheep's clothing but inwardly are ravenous wolves. You will know them by their fruits. Are grapes gathered from thorns, or figs from thistles? So, every sound tree bears good fruit, but the bad tree bears evil fruit. A sound tree cannot bear evil fruit, nor can a bad tree bear good fruit. Every tree that does not bear good fruit is cut down and thrown into the fire. Thus you will know them by their fruits.

— Matthew 7:15–20, Revised Standard Version

The canonical gospels address the same point of a false prophet predicting correctly, and Jesus predicted the future appearance of false christs and false prophets, affirming that they can perform great signs and miracles, for example, in the Olivet Discourse given on the Mount of Olives:

And Jesus began to say to them, 'Take heed that no one leads you astray. Many will come in my name, saying, 'I am he!' and they will lead many astray. And when you hear of wars and rumors of wars, do not be alarmed; this must take place, but the end is not yet. [...] And then if any one says to you, 'Look, here is the Christ!' or 'Look, there he is!' do not believe it. False christs and false prophets will arise and show signs and wonders, to lead astray, if possible, the elect. But take heed; I have told you all things beforehand'."

— Mark 13:5–7, 21–23, Revised Standard Version

Take heed that no one leads you astray. For many will come in my name, saying, 'I am the Christ', and they will lead many astray. [...] And many false prophets will arise and lead many astray. [...] Then if any one says to you, 'Lo, here is the Christ!' or 'There he is!', do not believe it. For false christs and false prophets will arise and show great signs and wonders, so as to lead astray, if possible, even the elect. Lo, I have told you beforehand. So, if they say to you, 'Lo, he is in the wilderness', do not go out; if they say, 'Lo, he is in the inner rooms', do not believe it.

— Matthew 24:4–5, 11, 23–26, Revised Standard Version

In the Gospel of Luke, Jesus uses an ethical application for his disciples using the analogy of false prophets in the Old Testament:

Woe to you, when all men speak well of you, for so their fathers did to the false prophets.

— Luke 6:26, Revised Standard Version

=== Acts and Epistles ===
In the Book of Acts, the apostles Paul and Barnabas encountered a false prophet named Elymas Bar-Jesus on the island of Cyprus:

When they had gone through the whole island as far as Paphos, they came upon a certain magician, a Jewish false prophet, named Bar-Jesus. He was with the proconsul, Sergius Paulus, a man of intelligence, who summoned Barnabas and Saul and sought to hear the word of God. But Elymas the magician (for that is the meaning of his name) withstood them, seeking to turn away the proconsul from the faith. But Saul, who is also called Paul, filled with the Holy Spirit, looked intently at him and said, 'You son of the devil, you enemy of all righteousness, full of all deceit and villainy, will you not stop making crooked the straight paths of the Lord? And now, behold, the hand of the Lord is upon you, and you shall be blind and unable to see the sun for a time.' Immediately mist and darkness fell upon him and he went about seeking people to lead him by the hand. Then the proconsul believed, when he saw what had occurred, for he was astonished at the teaching of the Lord."

— Acts 13:6–12, Revised Standard Version

The Second Epistle of Peter makes a comparison between false teachers and false prophets and how the former will bring in false teachings, just like the false prophets of old:

But false prophets also arose among the people, just as there will be false teachers among you, who will secretly bring in destructive heresies, even denying the Master who bought them, bringing upon themselves swift destruction. And many will follow their licentiousness, and because of them, the way of truth will be reviled. And in their greed they will exploit you with false words; from of old their condemnation has not been idle, and their destruction has not been asleep.

— 2 Peter 2:1–3, Revised Standard Version

The First Epistle of John warns those of the Christian faith to test every spirit because of false prophets:

Beloved, do not believe every spirit, but test the spirits to see whether they are of God; for many false prophets have gone out into the world. By this, you know the Spirit of God: every spirit which confesses that Jesus Christ has come in the flesh is of God, and every spirit which does not confess Jesus is not of God. This is the spirit of antichrist, of which you heard that it was coming, and now it is in the world already.

— 1 John 4:1–3, Revised Standard Version

=== The false prophet of Revelation ===
The most well-known New Testament false prophet is the one mentioned in the Book of Revelation. The False Prophet is ultimately cast into the fiery lake with burning sulphur:

And the Beast was captured, and with it the false prophet who in its presence had worked the signs by which he deceived those who had received the mark of the Beast and those who worshiped its image. These two were thrown alive into the lake of fire that burns with sulphur.

— Revelation 19:20, Revised Standard Version

And the Devil who had deceived them was thrown into the lake of fire and sulphur, where the Beast and the false prophet were, and shall be tormented day and night forever and ever.

— Revelation 20:10, Revised Standard Version

Another mention of a false prophet in the New Testament is the "antichrist spirit which denies the Son". In the New Testament, the word antichrist (Greek: antikhristos) appears mainly in the Johannine epistles and in the plural, denoting those who deny and/or do not believe in the messiahship of Jesus. A similar term, pseudochrist (Greek: pseudokhristos, meaning 'false messiah'), is used by Jesus in the Gospels. These terms seem to refer to a category of people rather than a single individual.

== Islam ==
The Quran states that Muhammad is the "Seal of the Prophets" and Last and Final of the Prophets, which is understood by mainstream Sunni to mean that any ostensible prophets after Muhammed are false. All mainstream Muslim scholars' perspectives from both Sunni and Shīʿa denominations do not consider the Second Coming of ʿĪsā (Jesus) as the coming of a new prophet, since the Islamic Messiah had already been an existing prophet and will rule by the Quran and sunnah of Muhammad, bringing no new revelation or prophecy.

Thawban ibn Kaidad narrated that Muhammad said:

"There will be 30 dajjals among my Ummah. Each one will claim that he is a prophet; but I am the last of the Prophets (Seal of the Prophets), and there will be no Prophet after me."

— Related by Ahmad ibn Hanbal as a sound hâdith.

Abu Hurairah narrated that Muhammad said:

"The Hour will not be established (1) till two big groups fight each other whereupon there will be a great number of casualties on both sides and they will be following one and the same religious doctrine, (2) till about thirty dajjals (liars) appear, and each one of them will claim that he is Allah's Messenger..."

— Sahih al-Bukhari 7121

Muhammad also stated that the last of these dajjals would be the Antichrist, Al-Masih ad-Dajjal (Arabic: دجّال, romanized: Al-Masīḥ ad-Dajjāl, lit. 'Deceitful Messiah'). The Dajjal is never mentioned in the Quran, but is mentioned and described in the ḥadīth literature. Like in Christianity, the Dajjal is said to emerge out of the east, although the specific location varies among the various sources. The Dajjal will imitate the miracles performed by ʿĪsā (Jesus), such as healing the sick and raising the dead, the latter done with the aid of demons (Shayāṭīn). He will deceive many people, such as weavers, magicians, half-castes, and children of prostitutes, but the majority of his followers will be Jews. According to the Islamic eschatological narrative, the events related to the final battle before the Day of Judgment will proceed in the following order:

Eleven hadith also report on the "Greater Signs" of the end, which include the appearance of the Antichrist (Dajjal) and the reappearance of the prophet Jesus to join in battle with him at Dabbiq in Syria, as well as the arrival of the Mahdī, the "guided one". As another hadith attributed to Alī ibn Abī Talib puts it, "Most of the Dajjal’s followers are Jews and children of fornication; the Dajjal will be killed in Syria, at a pass called the Pass of Afiq, after three hours are gone from the day, at the hand of Jesus".

Samra ibn Jundab reported that once Muhammad, while delivering a ceremonial speech at an occasion of a solar eclipse, said:

"Verily by Allah, the Last Hour will not come until 30 dajjals will appear and the final one will be the One-eyed False Messiah."

— Related by Imam Ahmed and Imam Tabarani as a sound hâdith.

Anas ibn Malik narrated that Muhammad said:

There is never a prophet who has not warned the Ummah of that one-eyed liar; behold he is one-eyed and your Lord is not one-eyed. On his forehead are the letters k. f. r. (Kafir).

— Sahih Muslim 2933a

Dajjal is blind of one eye and there is written between his eyes the word "Kafir". He then spelled the word as k. f. r., which every Muslim would be able to read.

— Sahih Muslim 2933c

The Mahdi (Arabic: ٱلْمَهْدِيّ, romanized: al-Mahdī, meaning "the rightly guided one") is the redeemer according to Islam. Just like the Dajjal, the Mahdi is never mentioned in the Quran but his description can be found in the ḥadīth literature; according to the Islamic eschatological narrative, he will appear on Earth before the Day of Judgment. At the time of the Second Coming of Christ, the prophet ʿĪsā shall return to defeat and kill al-Masih ad-Dajjal. Muslims believe that both ʿĪsā and the Mahdi will rid the world of wrongdoing, injustice, and tyranny, ensuring peace and tranquility. Eventually, the Dajjal will be killed by the Mahdi and ʿĪsā at the gate of Lud, who upon seeing Dajjal will cause him to slowly dissolve (like salt in water).

== Use outside of religions ==
The term false prophet is sometimes applied outside religious usage, to describe promoters of scientific, medical, or political theories which the author of the phrase thinks are false. Paul Offit's 2008 book Autism's False Prophets applied the phrase to promoters of unproven theories and therapies such as the unsupported relationship between thiomersal and vaccines and chelation therapy. Ronald Bailey's 1993 book Ecoscam: The False Prophets of Ecological Apocalypse applied the phrase to promoters of the global warming hypothesis; however, by 2005 Bailey had changed his mind, writing "Anyone still holding onto the idea that there is no global warming ought to hang it up." Another usage of the term "false prophet" is used in the Genesis song, Supper's Ready where a man who is called by the community "The Guaranteed Eternal Sanctuary Man" turns out to be the Anti-christ and brings upon an apocalypse, yet the plan fails, leading for him, and the "beast" he brought across the world to be obliterated, and the 2 main characters, were brought to the New Jerusalem.

== See also ==
- Apocalypticism
- False god
- Idolatry
- Jerusalem syndrome
- List of messiah claimants
  - List of people claimed to be Jesus
- Messiah complex
- Messianic Age
- Millennialism
- Prophets of Christianity
- Religious delusion
- True-believer syndrome
- Unfulfilled Christian religious predictions

== Bibliography ==
- "Antichrist". Jewish Virtual Library. American–Israeli Cooperative Enterprise (AICE). 2020 [2017]. Archived from the original on 10 February 2017.
- Arena, Francesco (September 2020). Lemche, Niels Peter (ed.). "False Prophets in the Book of Jeremiah: Did They All Prophesy and Speak Falsehood?". Scandinavian Journal of the Old Testament. 34 (2). Taylor & Francis: 187–200. doi:10.1080/09018328.2020.1807104. ISSN 1502-7244. S2CID 221866227.
- Burnight, John (September 2021). Shepherd, David; Tiemeyer, Lena-Sofia (eds.). "Is Eliphaz a false prophet? The vision in Job 4.12-21". Journal for the Study of the Old Testament. 46 (1). SAGE Publications: 96–116. doi:10.1177/03090892211001404. ISSN 1476-6728. S2CID 238412522.
- Dawson, Lorne L. (October 1999). "When Prophecy Fails and Faith Persists: A Theoretical Overview" (PDF). Nova Religio: The Journal of Alternative and Emergent Religions. 3 (1). Berkeley: University of California Press: 60–82. doi:10.1525/nr.1999.3.1.60. ISSN 1092-6690. LCCN 98656716. S2CID 144984626.
- Dewick, E. C. (2011) [1912]. Primitive Christian Eschatology. Cambridge: Cambridge University Press. ISBN 978-0-521-23325-5.
- Fekkes, Jan (1994). "John as a Jewish-Christian Prophet". Isaiah and Prophetic Traditions in the Book of Revelation: Visionary Antecedents and their Development. The Library of New Testament Studies. Vol. 93. Sheffield: Sheffield Academic Press. pp. 22–58. ISBN 9781850754565.
- Lietaert Peerbolte, Bert Jan (2013). "How Antichrist Defeated Death: The Development of Christian Apocalyptic Eschatology in the Early Church". In Krans, Jan; Lietaert Peerbolte, L. J.; Smit, Peter-Ben; Zwiep, Arie W. (eds.). Paul, John, and Apocalyptic Eschatology: Studies in Honour of Martinus C. de Boer. Novum Testamentum: Supplements. Vol. 149. Leiden: Brill Publishers. pp. 238–255. doi:10.1163/9789004250369_016. ISBN 978-90-04-25026-0. ISSN 0167-9732. S2CID 191738355.
- Lietaert Peerbolte, L. J. (1999). "Antichrist (ἀντίχριστος)". In Van der Toorn, Karel; Becking, Bob; Van der Horst, Pieter W. (eds.). Dictionary of Deities and Demons in the Bible (2nd ed.). Leiden: Brill Publishers. pp. 62–64. doi:10.1163/2589-7802_DDDO_DDDO_Antichrist. ISBN 90-04-11119-0.
- Lietaert Peerbolte, L. J. (1996). The Antecedents of Antichrist: A Traditio-Historical Study of the Earliest Christian Views on Eschatological Opponents. Supplements to the Journal for the Study of Judaism. Vol. 49. Leiden: Brill Publishers. ISBN 978-90-04-10455-6.
- Schwarz, Hans (2000). "The Signs of the End". Eschatology. Grand Rapids, Michigan: Wm. B. Eerdmans. pp. 381–387. ISBN 0-8028-4733-1.
- Sim, David C. (1996). Apocalyptic Eschatology in the Gospel of Matthew. Society for New Testament Studies: Monograph Series. Vol. 88. Cambridge: Cambridge University Press. doi:10.1017/CBO9780511555084. ISBN 978-0-521-55365-0.
